The Land of Israel, also referred to as the Holy Land or as Palestine, is the birthplace of the Jewish people and Judaism. It is where the Hebrews and Israelites established and developed Israel and Judah, and is also thought to be the region of development for the completed form of the Hebrew Bible; Jews, alongside the Samaritan people, are accredited as ethnic groups originating from the Israelites. Through the influence of Jewish prophets, many of whom were based in the Land of Israel, Jewish traditions came to serve as the basis of the Abrahamic religions. In the 1st century, the Land of Israel also became the birthplace of Christianity, the world's most widespread religion, based on the teachings of Jesus of Nazareth. Throughout the course of human history, the Land of Israel has come under the sway or control of various polities, and as a result, it has historically hosted a wide variety of ethnic groups. In addition to the region's core significance to Judaism and Samaritanism, it is regarded with an especially high degree of holiness in Christianity, Islam, Druzism, the Baháʼí Faith, and a variety of other religious movements whose fundamental theological values trace back to Abraham, a Hebrew patriarch.

Canaan, as the region was known during the Bronze Age, was characterized by city-states that ultimately came under the rule of Egypt. Two Israelite kingdoms—Judah and Israel—emerged during the Iron Age, alongside a Philistine polity. In the following centuries, the Assyrian, Babylonian, and Persian Empires conquered the region. The Ptolemies and the Seleucids vied for control over the region during the Hellenistic period. However, with the establishment of the Hasmonean dynasty, the local Jewish population maintained independence for a century before being incorporated into the Roman Republic. As a result of the Jewish-Roman Wars in the 1st and 2nd centuries CE, many Jews were killed, displaced or sold into slavery. Following the advent of Christianity, which was adopted by the Greco-Roman world under the influence of the Roman Empire, the region's demographics shifted towards newfound Christians, who replaced Jews as the majority of the population by the 4th century. However, shortly after Islam was consolidated across the Arabian Peninsula under Muhammad, Byzantine Christian rule over the Land of Israel was superseded by the Arab conquest of the Levant in the 7th century. From the 11th century to the 13th century, the Land of Israel became the centre for intermittent religious wars between Christian and Muslim armies as part of the Crusades. In the 13th century, the Land of Israel became subject to the Mongol invasions and conquests, though these were locally routed by the Mamluk Sultanate, under whose rule it remained until the 16th century. The Mamluks were eventually defeated by the Ottoman Empire, and the region became an Ottoman province until the 20th century.

The late 19th century saw the widespread consolidation of a Jewish nationalist movement known as Zionism, as part of which aliyah (Jewish return to the Land of Israel from the diaspora) increased. During World War I, the Sinai and Palestine campaign of the Allies led to the partitioning of the Ottoman Empire. Britain was granted control of the region by League of Nations mandate, in what became known as Mandatory Palestine. The British government publicly committed itself to the creation of a Jewish homeland. Arab nationalism opposed this design, asserting Arab rights over the former Ottoman territories and seeking to prevent Jewish migration. As a result, Arab–Jewish tensions grew in the succeeding decades of British administration.

In 1948, the Israeli Declaration of Independence sparked the 1948 Arab–Israeli War, which resulted in the 1948 Palestinian exodus and subsequently led to waves of Jewish emigration from other parts of the Middle East. Today, approximately 43 percent of the global Jewish population resides in Israel. In 1979, the Egypt–Israel peace treaty was signed, based on the Camp David Accords. In 1993, Israel signed the Oslo I Accord with the Palestine Liberation Organization, which was followed by the establishment of the Palestinian National Authority. In 1994, the Israel–Jordan peace treaty was signed. Despite efforts to finalize the peace agreement, the conflict continues to play a major role in Israeli and international political, social, and economic life.

Prehistory

The oldest evidence of early humans in the territory of modern Israel, dating to 1.5 million years ago, was found in Ubeidiya near the Sea of Galilee. Flint tool artefacts have been discovered at Yiron, the oldest stone tools found anywhere outside Africa. Other groups include 1.4 million years old Acheulean industry, the Bizat Ruhama group and Gesher Bnot Yaakov.

In the Mount Carmel area at el-Tabun, and Es Skhul, Neanderthal and early modern human remains were found, showing the longest stratigraphic record in the region, spanning 600,000 years of human activity, from the Lower Paleolithic to the present day, representing roughly a million years of human evolution. Other notable Paleolithic sites include caves Qesem and Manot. The oldest fossils of anatomically modern humans found outside Africa are the Skhul and Qafzeh hominids, who lived in northern Israel 120,000 years ago. Around 10th millennium BCE, the Natufian culture existed in the area.

Canaan (2000–1000 BCE) 

The Canaanites are archaeologically attested in the Middle Bronze Age (2100–1550 BCE). There were probably independent or semi-independent city-states. Cities were often surrounded by massive earthworks, resulting in the archeological tells common in the region today. In the late Middle Bronze Age, the Nile Delta in Egypt was settled by Canaanites who maintained close connections with Canaan. During that period, the Hyksos, dynasties of Canaanite/Asiatic origin, ruled much of Lower Egypt before being overthrown in the 16th century BCE.

During the Late Bronze Age (1550–1200 BCE), there were Canaanite vassal states paying tribute to the New Kingdom of Egypt, which governed from Gaza. In 1457 BCE, Egyptian forces under the command of Pharaoh Thutmose III defeated a rebellious coalition of Canaanite vassal states led by Kadesh's king at the Battle of Megiddo.

In the Late Bronze Age there was a period of civilizational collapse in the Middle East, Canaan fell into chaos, and Egyptian control ended. There is evidence that urban centers such as Hazor, Beit She'an, Megiddo, Ekron, Ashdod and Ashkelon were damaged or destroyed. Two groups appear at this time, and are associated with the transition to the Iron Age (they used iron weapons/tools which were better than earlier bronze): the Sea Peoples, particularly the Philistines, who migrated from the Aegean world and settled on the southern coast, and the Israelites, whose settlements dotted the highlands.

Ancient Israel (1200–550 BCE )

Early Israelites (Iron Age I)

The earliest recorded evidence of a people by the name of Israel (as ) occurs in the Egyptian Merneptah Stele, erected for Pharaoh Merneptah (son of Ramesses II) c. 1209 BCE, which states "Israel is laid waste and his seed is not." Archeological evidence indicates that during the early Iron Age I, hundreds of small villages were established on the highlands of Canaan on both sides of the Jordan River, primarily in Samaria, north of Jerusalem. These villages had populations of up to 400, were largely self-sufficient and lived from herding, grain cultivation, and growing vines and olives with some economic interchange. The pottery was plain and undecorated. Writing was known and available for recording, even in small sites. William G. Dever sees this "Israel" in the central highlands as a cultural and probably political entity, more an ethnic group rather than an organized state.

Modern scholars believe that the Israelites and their culture branched out of the Canaanite peoples and their cultures through the development of a distinct monolatristic—and later monotheistic—religion centred on a national god Yahweh. According to McNutt, "It is probably safe to assume that sometime during Iron Age I a population began to identify itself as 'Israelite'", differentiating itself from the Canaanites through such markers as the prohibition of intermarriage, an emphasis on family history and genealogy, and religion. Monotheism, the belief in a single all-powerful law-giving God, is thought to have evolved among the Israelites gradually, over the next few centuries, from a number of separate cults, leading to the first versions of the religion now known as Judaism.

The first grapheme-based writing originated in the area, probably among Canaanites resident in Egypt. This evolved into the Phoenician alphabet from which all modern alphabetical writing systems are descended. The Paleo-Hebrew alphabet was one of the earliest and evidence of its use exists from about 1000 BCE (see the Gezer calendar), while the language spoken was Biblical Hebrew.

Philistine cooking tools and the prevalence of pork in their diets, and locally made Mycenaean pottery—which later evolved into bichrome Philistine pottery—all support their foreign origin. Their cities were large and elaborate, which—together with the findings—point out to a complex, hierarchical society.

Israel and Judah (Iron Age II)

In the 10th century BCE, the Israelite kingdoms of Judah and Israel emerged. The Hebrew Bible states that these were preceded by a single kingdom ruled by Saul, David and Solomon, who is said to have built the First Temple. Archeologists have debated whether the united monarchy ever existed, with those in favor of such a polity existing further divided between maximalists who support the Biblical accounts, and minimalists who argue that any such polity was likely smaller than suggested.

Historians and archaeologists agree that the northern Kingdom of Israel existed by  900 BCE and the Kingdom of Judah existed by  850 BCE. The Kingdom of Israel was the more prosperous of the two kingdoms and soon developed into a regional power; during the days of the Omride dynasty, it controlled Samaria, Galilee, the upper Jordan Valley, the Sharon and large parts of the Transjordan. Samaria, the capital, was home to one of the largest Iron Age structures in the Levant. The Kingdom of Israel's capital moved between Shechem, Penuel and Tirzah before Omri settled it in Samaria, and the royal succession was often settled by a military coup d'état. The Kingdom of Judah was smaller but more stable; the Davidic dynasty ruled the kingdom for the four centuries of its existence, with the capital always in Jerusalem, controlling the Judaean Mountains, most of the Shephelah and the Beersheba valley in the northern Negev.

In 854 BCE, according to Assyrian records (the Kurkh Monoliths), an alliance between Ahab of Israel and Ben Hadad II of Aram-Damascus managed to repulse the incursions of the Assyrians, with a victory at the Battle of Qarqar. This is not reported in the Bible which describes conflict between Ahab and Ben Hadad. Another important discovery of the period is the Mesha Stele, a Moabite stele found in Dhiban, now in the Louvre. In the stele, Mesha, king of Moab, tells how Chemosh, the god of Moab, had been angry with his people and had allowed them to be subjugated to the Kingdom of Israel, but at length, Chemosh returned and assisted Mesha to throw off the yoke of Israel and restore the lands of Moab. It refers to Omri, king of Israel, to the god Yahweh, and may contain another early reference to the House of David. Jehu, son of Omri, is referenced by the Black Obelisk of Shalmaneser III.

Assyrian invasions 

Tiglath-Pileser III of Assyria invaded Israel in around 732 BCE. The Kingdom of Israel fell to the Assyrians following a long siege of the capital Samaria around 720 BCE. The records of Sargon II of Assyria indicate that he captured Samaria and deported 27,290 inhabitants to Mesopotamia. It is likely that Shalmaneser captured the city since both the Babylonian Chronicles and the Hebrew Bible viewed the fall of Israel as the signature event of his reign. The Assyrian deportations became the basis for the Jewish idea of the Ten Lost Tribes. Foreign groups were settled by the Assyrians in the territories of the fallen kingdom. The Samaritans claim to be descended from Israelites of ancient Samaria who were not expelled by the Assyrians.

It is believed that refugees from the destruction of Israel moved to Judah, massively expanding Jerusalem and leading to construction of the Siloam Tunnel during the rule of King Hezekiah (ruled 715–686 BCE). The tunnel could provide water during a siege and its construction is described in the Bible. The Siloam inscription, a plaque written in Hebrew left by the construction team, was discovered in the tunnel in 1880s, and is today held by the Istanbul Archaeology Museum.
During Hezekiah's rule, Sennacherib, the son of Sargon, attempted but failed to capture Judah. Assyrian records say that Sennacherib levelled 46 walled cities and besieged Jerusalem, leaving after receiving extensive tribute. The Bible, which claims that an angel of God saved Jerusalem, destroying the Assyrian camp over-night, also refers to tribute, and suggests that Hezekiah was aided by Taharqa, king of Kush (now Sudan), in repulsing the Assyrians. The Twenty-fifth Dynasty of Egypt were Nubian Pharaohs and they probably defeated the Assyrians. Sennacherib had a 12 meter by 5-metre frieze erected in his palace in Nineveh (now in Iraq) depicting his victory at Lachish, the second largest city of Judah.

The writings of four different "prophets" are believed to date from this period: Hosea and Amos in Israel and Micah and Isaiah of Judah. These men were mostly social critics who warned of the Assyrian threat and acted as religious spokesmen. They exercised some form of free speech and may have played a significant social and political role in Israel and Judah. They urged rulers and the general populace to adhere to god-conscious ethical ideals, seeing the Assyrian invasions as a divine punishment of the collective resulting from ethical failures.

Under King Josiah (ruler from 641 – 619), the Book of Deuteronomy was either rediscovered or written. The Book of Joshua and the accounts of the kingship of David and Solomon in the book of Kings are believed to have the same author. The books are known as Deuteronomist and considered to be a key step in the emergence of monotheism in Judah. They emerged at a time that Assyria was weakened by the emergence of Babylon and may be a committing to text of pre-writing verbal traditions.

Babylonian period (587–538 BCE) 

During the late 7th century BCE, Judah became a vassal state of the Neo-Babylonian Empire. In 601 BCE, Jehoiakim of Judah allied with Babylon's principal rival, Egypt, despite the strong remonstrances of the prophet Jeremiah. As a punishment, the Babylonians besieged Jerusalem in 597 BCE, and the city surrendered. The defeat was recorded by the Babylonians. Nebuchadnezzar pillaged Jerusalem and deported king Jehoiachin, along with other prominent citizens, to Babylon; Zedekiah, his uncle, was installed as king. A few years later, Zedekiah launched another revolt against Babylon, and an army was sent to conquer Jerusalem.

In 587 or 586 BCE, King Nebuchadnezzar II of Babylon conquered Jerusalem, destroyed the First Temple and razed the city. The Kingdom of Judah was abolished, and many of its citizens were exiled to Babylon. The former territory of Judah became a Babylonian province called Yehud with its center in Mizpah, north of the destroyed Jerusalem. Tablets that describe King Jehoicahin's rations were found in the ruins of Babylon. He was eventually released by the Babylonians. According to both the Bible and the Talmud, the Davidic dynasty continued as head of Babylonian Jewry, called the "Rosh Galut" (exilarch or head of exile). Arab and Jewish sources show that the Rosh Galut continued to exist for another 1,500 years in what is now Iraq, ending in the eleventh century.

Second Temple period (6th century BCE–2nd century CE)

Persian period (538–332 BCE) 

In 538 BCE, Cyrus the Great of the Achaemenid Empire conquered Babylon and took over its empire. Cyrus issued a proclamation granting religious freedom to all peoples subjugated by the Babylonians (see the Cyrus Cylinder). According to the Bible, Jewish exiles in Babylon, including 50,000 Judeans led by Zerubabel, returned to Judah to rebuild the Temple in Jerusalem. The Second Temple was subsequently completed c. 515 BCE. A second group of 5,000, led by Ezra and Nehemiah, returned to Judah in 456 BCE. The first was empowered by the Persian king to enforce religious rules, the second had the status of governor and a royal mission to restore the walls of the city. The country remained a province of the Achaemenid empire called Yehud until 332 BCE.

The final text of the Torah (the first five books of the Bible) is thought to have been written during the Persian period (probably 450–350 BCE). The text was formed by editing and unifying earlier texts. The returning Israelites adopted an Aramaic script (also known as the Ashuri alphabet), which they brought back from Babylon; this is the current Hebrew script. The Hebrew calendar closely resembles the Babylonian calendar and probably dates from this period.

The Bible describes tension between the returnees, the elite of the First Temple period, and those who had remained in Judah. It is possible that the returnees, supported by the Persian monarchy, became large landholders at the expense of the people who had remained to work the land in Palestine, whose opposition to the Second Temple would have reflected a fear that exclusion from the cult would deprive them of land rights. Judah had become in practice a theocracy, ruled by hereditary High Priests and a Persian-appointed governor, frequently Jewish, charged with keeping order and seeing that tribute was paid.

A Judean military garrison was placed by the Persians on Elephantine Island near Aswan in Egypt. In the early 20th century, 175 papyrus documents recording activity in this community were discovered, including the "Passover Papyrus", a letter instructing the garrison on how to correctly conduct the Passover feast.

Hellenistic period (333–64 BCE) 

In 332 BCE, Alexander the Great of Macedon conquered the region as part of his campaign against the Persian Empire. After his death in 322 BCE, his generals divided the empire and Judea became a frontier region between the Seleucid Empire and Ptolemaic Kingdom in Egypt. Following a century of Ptolemaic rule, Judea was conquered by the Seleucid Empire in 200 BCE at the battle of Panium. Hellenistic rulers generally respected Jewish culture and protected Jewish institutions. Judea was ruled by the hereditary office of the High Priest of Israel as a Hellenistic vassal. Nevertheless, the region underwent a process of Hellenization, which heightened tensions between Greeks, Hellenized Jews, and observant Jews. These tensions escalated into clashes involving a power struggle for the position of high priest and the character of the holy city of Jerusalem.<ref>Ginzberg, Lewis.  Jewish Encyclopedia.</ref>

When Antiochus IV Epiphanes consecrated the temple, forbade Jewish practices, and forcibly imposed Hellenistic norms on the Jews, several centuries of religious tolerance under Hellenistic control came to an end. In 167 BCE, the Maccabean revolt erupted after Mattathias, a Jewish priest of the Hasmonean lineage, killed a Hellenized Jew and a Seleucid official who participated in sacrifice to the Greek gods in Modi'in. His son Judas Maccabeus defeated the Seleucids in several battles, and in 164 BCE, he captured Jerusalem and restored temple worship, an event commemorated by the Jewish festival of Hannukah.

After Judas' death, his brothers Jonathan Apphus and Simon Thassi were able to establish and consolidate a vassal Hasmonean state in Judea, capitalizing on the Seleucid Empire's decline as a result of internal instability and wars with the Parthians, and by forging ties with the rising Roman Republic. Hasmonean leader John Hyrcanus was able to gain independence, doubling Judea's territories. He took control of Idumaea, where he converted the Edomites to Judaism, and invaded Scythopolis and Samaria, where he demolished the Samaritan Temple. Hyrcanus was also the first Hasmonean leader to mint coins. Under his sons, kings Aristobulus I and Alexander Jannaeus, Hasmonean Judea became a kingdom, and its territories continued to expand, now also covering the coastal plain, Galilee and parts of the Transjordan. Some scholars argue that the Hasmonean dynasty also institutionalized the final Jewish biblical canon.

Under Hasmonean rule, the Pharisees, Sadducees and the mystic Essenes emerged as the principal Jewish social movements. The Pharisee sage Simeon ben Shetach is credited with establishing the first schools based around meeting houses. This was a key step in the emergence of Rabbinical Judaism. After Jannaeus' widow, queen Salome Alexandra, died in 67 BCE, her sons Hyrcanus II and Aristobulus II engaged in a civil war over succession. The conflicting parties requested Pompey's assistance on their behalf, which paved the way for a Roman takeover of the kingdom.

 Early Roman period (64 BCE–2nd century CE) 

In 64 BCE the Roman general Pompey conquered Syria and intervened in the Hasmonean civil war in Jerusalem, restoring Hyrcanus II as High Priest and making Judea a Roman vassal kingdom. During the siege of Alexandria in 47 BCE, the lives of Julius Caesar and his protégé Cleopatra were saved by 3,000 Jewish troops sent by Hyrcanus II and commanded by Antipater, whose descendants Caesar made kings of Judea. From 37 BCE to 6 CE, the Herodian dynasty, Jewish-Roman client kings of Edomite origin, descended from Antipater, ruled Judea. Herod the Great considerably enlarged the temple (see Herod's Temple), making it one of the largest religious structures in the world. At this time, Jews formed as much as 10% of the population of the entire Roman Empire, with large communities in North Africa and Arabia.

Augustus made Judea a Roman province in 6 CE, deposing the last Jewish king, Herod Archelaus, and appointing a Roman governor. There was a small revolt against Roman taxation led by Judas of Galilee and over the next decades tensions grew between the Greco-Roman and Judean population centered on attempts to place effigies of emperor Caligula in synagogues and in the Jewish temple. In 64 CE, the Temple High Priest Joshua ben Gamla introduced a religious requirement for Jewish boys to learn to read from the age of six. Over the next few hundred years this requirement became steadily more ingrained in Jewish tradition. The latter part of the Second Temple period was marked by social unrest and religious turmoil, and messianic expectations filled the atmosphere.

 Jewish–Roman wars 

In 66 CE, the First Jewish-Roman War (66–73 CE) broke out due to the repressive rule of Roman governors, growing hostility between the wealthy nobles and the impoverished masses, clashes between Jews and pagans in mixed cities, and tensions between the Roman and Jewish religions. The revolting Jews named their state "Israel", Despite early Jewish victories, the provisional government quickly collapsed, and Jews were split up into several warrying factions with conflicting agendas. Eventually, the Roman army under the command of future emperors Vespasian and his son Titus besieged and destroyed the major Jewish strongholds one by one, including the cities of Yodfat, Gamla and the fortress of Masada. After a brutal five-month siege in 70 CE, Jerusalem and the Second Temple were completely destroyed. 

The revolt's failure had profound demographic, theological, political, and economic consequences. Many Jews died fighting and under siege during the revolt, and a sizable portion of the population was either expelled from the country or displaced. Without the Temple, Judaism had to change to ensure its survival. Judaism's Temple-based sects, most notably the Sadducees, vanished. The Pharisees, led by Yochanan ben Zakai, obtained Roman permission to establish a school at Yavne. Their teachings became the foundational, liturgical, and ritualistic basis for Rabbinic Judaism, which eventually became the mainstream form of Judaism.

From 115 to 117, tensions and attacks on Jews around the Roman Empire led to a massive Jewish uprising against Rome, known as the Kitos War. Jews in Libya, Egypt, Cyprus and Mesopotamia fought against Rome. This conflict was accompanied by large-scale massacres of both sides. Cyprus was so severely depopulated that new settlers were imported and Jews banned from living there.

In 132 CE, the Bar Kokhba revolt erupted. The uprising was led by a Jew named Simon Bar Kokhba, who ruled as nasi, and was viewed by some of the rabbis of the period as the long-awaited messiah. Based on the Bar Kokhba revolt coinage, the independent Jewish state was named "Israel". It has been suggested that a rabbinical assembly which convened during the revolt decided which books could be regarded as part of the Hebrew Bible; the Jewish apocrypha and Christian books were excluded. As a result, the original text of some Hebrew texts, including the Books of Maccabees, were lost (Greek translations survived). A rabbi of this period, Simeon bar Yochai, is regarded as the author of the Zohar, the foundational text for Kabbalistic thought. However, modern scholars believe it was written in Medieval Spain. Christians refused to participate in the revolt and from this point the Jews regarded Christianity as a separate religion.

The Bar Kokhba revolt was eventually crushed by emperor Hadrian himself, with serious losses. Today, it is viewed by modern scholars as having decisive historic importance. According to Cassius Dio, writing in the century following the revolt, "50 of the Jews most important outposts and 985 of their most famous villages were razed to the ground. 580,000 men were slain in the various raids and battles, and the number of those that perished by famine, disease and fire was past finding out, thus nearly the whole of Judaea was made desolate." While scholars debate whether these numbers are accurate, archaeological surveys and excavations appear to confirm the claim of Cassius Dio that the district of Judaea was largely depopulated. Most scholars agree that, in contrast to the aftermath of the First Jewish–Roman War, Judea was devastated after the Bar Kokhba revolt, with many Jews killed, exiled, or sold into slavery.M. Avi-Yonah, The Jews under Roman and Byzantine Rule, Jerusalem 1984 pp. 12–14

Around the time of the revolt, the province of Judaea (Iudaea) was renamed Syria Palaestina. The commonly-held view is that it was implemented as punishment for the Bar Kokhba revolt or to "disassociate the Jewish people from their historical homeland" and hold Hadrian accountable.H.H. Ben-Sasson, A History of the Jewish People, Harvard University Press, 1976, page 334: "In an effort to wipe out all memory of the bond between the Jews and the land, Hadrian changed the name of the province from Iudaea to Syria-Palestina, a name that became common in non-Jewish literature."Ronald Syme suggested the name change preceded the revolt; he writes "Hadrian was in those parts in 129 and 130. He abolished the name of Jerusalem, refounding the place as a colony, Aelia Capitolina. That helped to provoke the rebellion. The supersession of the ethnical term  by the geographical may also reflect Hadrian's decided opinions about Jews."  (page 90) However, no evidence exists for this narrative, and it has been disputed by scholars in recent years.The term Syria-Palaestina was already in use in the Greco-Roman world at least five centuries earlier. Herodotus, for example, used the term in the 5th century BC when discussing the component parts of the fifth province of the Achaemenid Empire: Phoenicia, Cyprus, "and that part of Syria which is called Palestine". "The full Herodotus quote is "from the town of Posideion, which was founded by Amphilocus son of Amphiaraus, on the border between Cilicia and Syria, beginning from this as far as Egypt —omitting Arabian territory (which was free of tax), came 350 talents. In this province there is the whole of Phoenicia and that part of Syria which is called Palestine, and Cyprus.  This is the fifth province"  No other revolt led to a province being renamed.

 Late Roman and Byzantine periods (2nd century–634 CE) 

After the Bar Kokhba revolt

As a result of the disastrous effects of the Bar Kokhba revolt, Jewish presence in the region significantly dwindled.  Over the next centuries, more Jews left to communities in the Diaspora, especially the large, speedily growing Jewish communities in Babylonia and Arabia. Others remained in the Land of Israel, where there was a continuous small Jewish presence and Galilee became its religious center. During this period, Judea was penetrated by pagan populations, including migrants from the nearby provinces of Syria, Phoenicia, and Arabia,שדמן, ע' (2016). בין נחל רבה לנחל שילה: תפרוסת היישוב הכפרי בתקופות ההלניסטית, הרומית והביזנטית לאור חפירות וסקרים. עבודת דוקטור, אוניברסיטת בר-אילן. עמ' 271–275. (Hebrew) while the Jewish population remained most concentrated in the Galilee, the southern Hebron Hills and on the coastal plain. The Mishnah and the Jerusalem Talmud, huge compendiums of Rabbinical discussions, were compiled during the 2nd to 4th centuries CE in Tiberias and Jerusalem.

The Romans permitted a hereditary Rabbinical Patriarch from the House of Hillel based in Galilee, called the "Nasi", to represent the Jews in dealings with the Romans. The most famous of these was Judah haNasi, who is credited with compiling the final version of the Mishnah (a massive body of Jewish religious texts interpreting the Bible) and with strengthening the educational demands of Judaism by requiring that illiterate Jews be treated as outcasts. According to one theory, as a result, many illiterate Jews may have converted to Christianity. Jewish seminaries, such as those at Shefaram and Bet Shearim, continued to produce scholars. The best of these became members of the Sanhedrin, which was located first at Sepphoris and later at Tiberias. Before the Bar Kochba uprising, an estimated 2/3 of the population of Galilee and 1/3 of the coastal region were Jewish. In the Galillee, many synagogues have been found dating from this period, and the burial site of the Sanhedrin leaders was discovered in 1936.History of the Jews, Volume II by Simon Dubnow (Barnes 1968), chapter 4 the Patriarchate in the Galillee (pages 96 - 117) There was a notable rivalry between Palestinian and Babylonian academies. The former thought that leaving the land in peaceful times was tantamount to idolatry and many would not ordain Babylonian students for fear they would then return to their Babylonian homeland, while Babylonian scholars thought that Palestinian rabbis were descendants of the 'inferior stock' putatively returning with Ezra after the Babylonian exile. An economic crisis and heavy taxation to finance the wars of imperial succession that affected the Roman empire in the 3rd century led to further Jewish migration from Syria Palaestina to the more tolerant Sassanid Empire, where a prosperous Jewish community with extensive seminaries existed in the area of Babylon.

Rome adopts Christianity

Early in the 4th century, the Emperor Constantine made Constantinople the capital of the East Roman Empire and made Christianity an accepted religion. His mother Helena made a pilgrimage to Jerusalem (326–328) and led the construction of the Church of the Nativity (birthplace of Jesus in Bethlehem), the Church of the Holy Sepulchre (burial site of Jesus in Jerusalem) and other key churches that still exist. The name Jerusalem was restored to Aelia Capitolina and became a Christian city. Jews were still banned from living in Jerusalem, but were allowed to visit and worship at the site of the ruined temple. Over the course of the next century Christians worked to eradicate "paganism", leading to the destruction of classical Roman traditions and eradication of their temples. In 351–2, another Jewish revolt in the Galilee erupted against a corrupt Roman governor.

 Byzantine period (390–634) 

The Roman Empire split in 390 CE and the region became part of the Eastern Roman Empire, known as the Byzantine Empire. Byzantine Christianity was dominated by the (Greek) Eastern Orthodox Church whose massive land ownership has extended into the present. The same period saw an influx of Christian pilgrims to the holy sites in Palaestina Prima, which had a tremendous positive impact on the economic growth and prosperity of the region. Several of them made the decision to settle in the area, which changed the demographic structure. Cities have grown, there have been more settlements, and several monasteries, hospitals, and hostels have been built. The construction of monasteries by monks near pagan settlements throughout the country encouraged the conversion of the regional pagan population. Some Jews had converted to Christianity. There are only a few reliable historical accounts that suggest so, but they refer to individuals rather than entire villages.

Judaism was the only non-Christian religion tolerated, but restrictions on Jews slowly increased to include a ban on building new places of worship, holding public office or owning Christian slaves. In 425, following the death of the last Nasi, Gamliel VI, the Sanhedrin was officially abolished and the title of Nasi banned. Several Samaritan Revolts erupted.

In 611, Khosrow II, ruler of Sassanid Persia, invaded the Byzantine Empire. He was helped by Jewish fighters recruited by Benjamin of Tiberias and captured Jerusalem in 614. The "True Cross" was captured by the Persians. The Jewish Himyarite Kingdom in Yemen may also have provided support. Nehemiah ben Hushiel was made governor of Jerusalem. Christian historians of the period claimed the Jews massacred Christians in the city, but there is no archeological evidence of destruction, leading modern historians to question their accounts.Archaeology Versus Written Sources: the Case of the Persian Conquest of Jerusalem in 614 by Yuri Stoyanov in ACTA MUSEI VARNAENSIS VIII-1 pg 351 - 358 In 628, Kavad II (son of Kosrow) returned Palestine and the True Cross to the Byzantines and signed a peace treaty with them. Following the Byzantine re-entry, Heraclius massacred the Jewish population of Galilee and Jerusalem, while renewing the ban on Jews entering the latter.

 Early Muslim period (634–1099) 

The Levant was conquered by an Arab army under the command of ʿUmar ibn al-Khaṭṭāb in 635, and became the province of Bilad al-Sham of the Rashidun Caliphate. Two military districts—Jund Filastin and Jund al-Urdunn—were established in Palestine. A new city called Ramlah was built as the Muslim capital of Jund Filastin, while Tiberias served as the capital of Jund al-Urdunn. The Byzantine ban on Jews living in Jerusalem came to an end.

In 661, Muawiyah was crowned Caliph in Jerusalem, becoming the first of the (Damascus-based) Umayyad dynasty. In 691, Umayyad Caliph Abd al-Malik (685–705) constructed the Dome of the Rock shrine on the Temple Mount, where the two Jewish temples had been located. A second building, the Al-Aqsa Mosque, was also erected on the Temple Mount in 705. Both buildings were rebuilt in the 10th century following a series of earthquakes.
Jews consider the Temple Mount (Muslim name Noble Sanctuary) to contain the Foundation Stone (see also Holy of Holies), which is the holiest site in Judaism. Jews believe it is the site where Abraham tried to sacrifice his son, Isaac, while Muslims believe that Abraham tried to sacrifice his son, Ishmael, in Mecca.

In 750, Arab discrimination against non-Arab Muslims led to the Abbasid Revolution and the Umayyads were replaced by the Abbasid Caliphs who built a new city, Baghdad, to be their capital. This period is known as the Islamic Golden Age, the Arab Empire was the largest in the world and Baghdad the largest and richest city. Both Arabs and minorities prospered across the region and much scientific progress was made. There were however setbacks: During the 8th century, the Caliph Umar II introduced a law requiring Jews and Christians to wear identifying clothing. Jews were required to wear yellow stars round their neck and on their hats, Christians had to wear Blue. Clothing regulations arose during repressive periods of Arab rule and were more designed to humiliate then persecute non-Muslims. A poll tax was imposed on all non-Muslims by Islamic rulers and failure to pay could result in imprisonment or worse. 

In 982, Caliph Al-Aziz Billah of the Cairo-based Fatimid dynasty conquered the region. The Fatimids were followers of Isma'ilism, a branch of Shia Islam and claimed descent from Fatima, Mohammed's daughter. Around the year 1010, the Church of Holy Sepulchre (believed to be Jesus burial site), was destroyed by Fatimid Caliph al-Hakim, who relented ten years later and paid for it to be rebuilt. In 1020 al-Hakim claimed divine status and the newly formed Druze religion gave him the status of a messiah.

Between the 7th and 11th centuries, Jewish scribes, called the Masoretes and located in Galilee, Jerusalem and Babylonia, established the Masoretic Text, which became the orthodox text of the Hebrew Bible.

 Demographic changes 
Although the Arab conquest was relatively peaceful and did not cause widespread destruction, it did alter the country's demographics significantly. Over the ensuing several centuries, the region experienced a drastic decline in its population, from an estimated 1 million during Roman and Byzantine times to some 300,000 by the early Ottoman period. This demographic collapse was accompanied by a slow process of Islamization, that resulted from the flight of non-Muslim populations, immigration of Muslims, and local conversion. The majority of the remaining populace belonged to the lowest classes. While the Arab conquerors themselves left the area after the conquest and moved on to other places, the settlement of Arab tribes in the area both before and after the conquest also contributed to the Islamization. As a result, the Muslim population steadily grew and the area became gradually dominated by Muslims on a political and social level.Christopher MacEvitt, The Crusades and the Christian World of the East: Rough Tolerance,   University of Pennsylvania Press, 2010 p.97 

During the early Islamic period, many Christians and Samaritans, belonging to the Byzantine upper class, migrated from the coastal cities to northern Syria and Cyprus, which were still under Byzantine control, while others fled to the central highlands and the Transjordan. As a result, the coastal towns, formerly important economic centers connected with the rest of the Byzantine world, were emptied of most of their residents. Some of these cities—namely Ashkelon, Acre, Arsuf, and Gaza—now fortified border towns, were resettled by Muslim populations, who developed them into significant Muslim centers. The region of Samaria also underwent a process of Islamization as a result of waves of conversion among the Samaritan population and the influx of Muslims into the area. The predominantly Jacobite Monophysitic Christian population had been hostile to Byzantium orthodoxy, and at times for that reason welcomed Muslim rule. There is no strong evidence for forced conversion, or for possibility that the jizya tax significantly affected such changes. 

The demographic situation in Palestine was further altered by urban decline under the Abbasids, and it is thought that the 749 earthquake hastened this process by causing an increase in the number of Jews, Christians, and Samaritans who emigrated to diaspora communities while also leaving behind others who remained in the devastated cities and poor villages until they converted to Islam. Historical records and archeological evidence suggest that many Samaritans converted under Abbasid and Tulunid rule, after suffering through severe difficulties such droughts, earthquakes, religious persecution, heavy taxes and anarchy. The same region also saw the settlement of Arabs. Over the period, the Samaritan population drastically decreased, with the rural Samaritan population converting to Islam, and small urban communities remaining in Nablus and Caesarea, as well as in Cairo, Damascus, Aleppo and Sarepta. Nevertheless, the Muslim population remained a minority in a predominantly Christian area, and it is likely that this status persisted until the Crusader period.

Crusades and Mongols (1099–1291)

In 1099, the First Crusade took Jerusalem and established a Catholic kingdom, known as the Kingdom of Jerusalem. During the conquest, both Muslims and Jews were indiscriminately massacred or sold into slavery. Jews encountered as the Crusaders travelled across Europe were given a choice of conversion or murder, and almost always chose martyrdom. The carnage continued when the Crusaders reached the Holy Land. Ashkenazi Orthodox Jews still recite a prayer in memory of the death and destruction caused by the Crusades.

Around 1180, Raynald of Châtillon, ruler of Transjordan, caused increasing conflict with the Ayyubid Sultan Saladin (Salah-al-Din), leading to the defeat of the Crusaders in the 1187 Battle of Hattin (above Tiberias). Saladin was able to peacefully take Jerusalem and conquered most of the former Kingdom of Jerusalem. Saladin's court physician was Maimonides, a refugee from Almohad (Muslim) persecution in Córdoba, Spain, where all non-Muslim religions had been banned. This was the end of the golden age of Jewish culture in Spain and Maimonides possessed extensive knowledge of Greek and Arab medicine. His religious writings (in Hebrew and Judeo-Arabic) are still studied by Orthodox Jews. According to tradition, Maimonides was buried in Tiberias. A Crusader city-state at Acre survived for another century.

The Christian world's response to the loss of Jerusalem came in the Third Crusade of 1190. After lengthy battles and negotiations, Richard the Lionheart and Saladin concluded the Treaty of Jaffa in 1192 whereby Christians were granted free passage to make pilgrimages to the holy sites, while Jerusalem remained under Muslim rule. In 1229, Jerusalem peacefully reverted into Christian control as part of a treaty between Holy Roman Emperor Frederick II and Ayyubid sultan al-Kamil that ended the Sixth Crusade. In 1244, Jerusalem was sacked by the Khwarezmian Tatars who decimated the city's Christian population, drove out the Jews and razed the city. The Khwarezmians were driven out by the Ayyubids in 1247. In 1258, the Mongols destroyed Baghdad, killing hundreds of thousands.

 Mamluk period (1291–1517) 

Between 1258 and 1291, the area was the frontier between Mongol invaders (occasional Crusader allies) and the Mamluks of Egypt. The conflict impoverished the country and severely reduced the population. 
In Egypt a caste of warrior slaves, known as the Mamluks, gradually took control of the kingdom. The Mamluks were mostly of Turkish origin, and were bought as children and then trained in warfare. They were highly prized warriors, who gave rulers independence of the native aristocracy. In Egypt they took control of the kingdom following a failed invasion by the Crusaders (Seventh Crusade). The first Mamluk Sultan, Qutuz of Egypt, defeated the Mongols in the Battle of Ain Jalut ("Goliath's spring" near Ein Harod), ending the Mongol advances. He was assassinated by one of his Generals, Baibars, who went on to eliminate most of the Crusader outposts. The Mamluks ruled Palestine until 1516, regarding it as part of Syria. In Hebron, Jews were banned from worshipping at the Cave of the Patriarchs (the second-holiest site in Judaism); they were only allowed to enter 7 steps inside the site and the ban remained in place until Israel assumed control of the West Bank in the Six Days War. The Egyptian Mamluk sultan Al-Ashraf Khalil conquered the last outpost of Crusader rule in 1291.

The Mamluks, continuing the policy of the Ayyubids, made the strategic decision to destroy the coastal area and to bring desolation to many of its cities, from Tyre in the north to Gaza in the south. Ports were destroyed and various materials were dumped to make them inoperable. The goal was to prevent attacks from the sea, given the fear of the return of the Crusaders. This had a long-term effect on those areas, which remained sparsely populated for centuries. The activity in that time concentrated more inland.

With the 1492 expulsion of Jews from Spain and 1497 persecution of Jews and Muslims by Manuel I of Portugal, many Jews moved eastward, with some deciding to settle in the Mamluk Palestine. As a consequence, the local Jewish community underwent significant rejuvenation. The influx of Sephardic Jews began under Mamluk rule in the 15th century, and continued throughout the 16th century and especially after the Ottoman conquest. As city-dwellers, the majority of Sephardic Jews preferred to settle in urban areas, mainly in Safed but also in Jerusalem, while the Musta'arbi community comprised the majority of the villagers' Jews. First, the two communities maintained separate synagogues and separate religious rituals, but over time, both the communities amalgamated, adopting a mostly Sephardic liturgy and identity.

Ottoman period (1516–1917)

Under the Mamluks, the area was a province of Bilad a-Sham (Syria). It was conquered by Turkish Sultan Selim I in 1516–17, becoming a part of the province of Ottoman Syria for the next four centuries, first as the Damascus Eyalet and later as the Syria Vilayet (following the Tanzimat reorganization of 1864).

Old Yishuv

With the more favorable conditions that followed the Ottoman conquest, the immigration of Jews fleeing Catholic Europe, which had already begun under Mamluk rule, continued, and soon an influx of exiled Sephardic Jews came to dominate the Jewish community in the area; in some cases, the Ottoman sultans encouraged that immigration. Suleiman the Magneficent's personal physician was Moses Hamon, an inquisition survivor. Jewish businesswomen dominated communication between the Harem and the outside world (see Esther Handali). Between 1535 and 1538 Suleiman the Magnificent (ruled 1520 – 1566) built the current city walls of Jerusalem; Jerusalem had been without walls since the early 13th century. The construction followed the historical outline of the city, but left out a key section of the City of David (today part of Silwan) and what is now known as Mount Zion.

In 1558 Selim II (1566–1574), successor to Suleiman, whose wife Nurbanu Sultan was Jewish, gave control of Tiberias to Doña Gracia Mendes Nasi, one of the richest women in Europe and an escapee from the inquisition. She encouraged Jewish refugees to settle in the area and established a Hebrew printing press. Safed became a centre for study of the Kabbalah. Doña Nasi's nephew, Joseph Nasi, was made governor of Tiberias and he encouraged Jewish settlement from Italy.

Jewish population was concentrated in Jerusalem, Hebron, Safed and Tiberias, known in Jewish tradition as the Four Holy Cities. Further migration occurred during the Khmelnytsky Uprising in Ukraine, which was accompanied by brutal massacres of tens of thousands of Jews.

In 1660, a Druze revolt led to the destruction of Safed and Tiberias.Joel Rappel, History of Eretz Israel from Prehistory up to 1882 (1980), vol. 2, p. 531. "In 1662 Sabbathai Sevi arrived to Jerusalem. It was the time when the Jewish settlements of Galilee were destroyed by the Druze: Tiberias was completely desolate and only a few of former Safed residents had returned...." In 1663 Sabbatai Zevi settled in Jerusalem, and was proclaimed as the Jewish messiah by Nathan of Gaza. He acquired a large number of followers before going to Istanbul in 1666, where Sultan Suleiman II forced him to convert to Islam. Many of his followers converted, forming a sect that still exists in Turkey, known as the Dönmeh. In the late 18th century a local Arab sheikh Zahir al-Umar created a de facto independent Emirate in the Galilee. Ottoman attempts to subdue the Sheikh failed, but after Zahir's death the Ottomans restored their rule in the area.

In 1799 Napoleon briefly occupied the country and planned a proclamation inviting Jews to create a state. The proclamation was shelved following his defeat at Acre. In 1831, Muhammad Ali of Egypt, an Ottoman ruler who left the Empire and tried to modernize Egypt, conquered Ottoman Syria and tried to revive and resettle much of its regions. His conscription policies led to a popular Arab revolt in 1834, resulting in major casualties for the local Arab peasants, and massacres of Christian and Jewish communities by the rebels. Following the revolt, Muhammad Pasha, the son of Muhammad Ali, expelled nearly 10,000 of the local peasants to Egypt, while bringing loyal Egyptian peasants and discharged soldiers to settle the coastline of Ottoman Syria. Northern Jordan Valley was settled by his Sudanese troops.

In 1838 there was another revolt by the Druze. In 1839 Moses Montefiore met with Muhammed Pasha in Egypt and signed an agreement to establish 100–200 Jewish villages in the Damascus Eyalet of Ottoman Syria, but in 1840 the Egyptians withdrew before the deal was implemented, returning the area to Ottoman governorship. In 1844, Jews constituted the largest population group in Jerusalem. By 1896 Jews constituted an absolute majority in Jerusalem, but the overall population in Palestine was 88% Muslim and 9% Christian.

Jewish emancipation and modern antisemitism

Before the 18th century, most law was produced and enforced by religious authorities in both the Islamic and the Christian world (see Canon Law) and Jewish communities existed autonomously, subject only to the Lords and Kings. Following the reformation, there was growing separation of religion and state in Europe, especially in Holland, where a group of Spanish Jewish exiles settled and practiced their religion freely. A few Jews agitated for legal equality and, in the 18th century, a Jewish enlightenment movement known as the Haskalah (Hebrew for education) emerged in Germany. The movement called for Jews to study science and philosophy as a means to modernize Judaism and gain social rights without conversion to Christianity. The movement grew and spread across Europe. The Haskalah created a new secular Jewish culture that included literature, history (Christian historians ignored their Jewish communities) and newspapers. 
During the 19th century, new notions of separation of church and state emerged in the French revolution and led to France becoming the first country to grant the Jews full citizenship. Other states in Western Europe and North America  followed during the 19th Century, leading to Jews gaining civil rights and economic freedom. A small number of Jews, such as the Rothschild family, achieved extraordinary wealth and notoriety. In Eastern Europe, new nations emerged from the Habsburg Empire, Russian Empire and Ottoman Empire (which between them ruled most of Eastern Europe), but the new nationalists mostly regarded Jews as an unwanted presence. Jews were usually the only non-Christian minority and spoke a distinct language (Yiddish or Ladino).

Jewish emancipation led to a reaction by conservative elements, and a movement emerged in Europe of people who called themselves "anti-Semites" (the term had not previously existed). These people saw the Jews as a foreign race, prone to evil, who could not be integrated into European society. Although anti-Semitism fed on the religious hatred of earlier times, many did not see conversion as a solution.

In the Russian Empire, Jews faced growing persecution and legal restrictions. Half the world's Jews lived in the Russian Empire, where they were restricted to living in the Pale of Settlement. Severe pogroms in the early 1880s and legal repression led to 2 million Jews emigrating from the Russian Empire. 1.5 million went to the United States. Popular destinations were also Germany, France, England, Holland, Argentina and Palestine.Oleg Budnitskii, Russian Jews Between the Reds and the Whites, 1917-1920,  University of Pennsylvania Press, 2012 pp.17-18. The arguments over emancipation and the Jewish migration led to talk of a Jewish Question.

Between 1882 and 1903, approximately 35,000 Jews moved to Palestine, known as the First Aliyah. "Russian" Jews established the Bilu and Hovevei Zion ("Lovers of Zion") movements with the aim of settling in Palestine. In 1878, "Russian" Jewish emigrants established the village of Petah Tikva, followed by Rishon LeZion in 1882. The existing Ashkenazi-Jewish communities were concentrated in the Four Holy Cities, extremely poor and relied on donations (halukka) from groups abroad, while the new settlements were small farming communities, but still relied on funding by the French Baron, Edmond James de Rothschild, who sought to establish profitable enterprises. Many early migrants could not find work and left, but despite the problems, more settlements arose and the community grew. After the Ottoman conquest of Yemen in 1881, a large number of Yemenite Jews also emigrated to Palestine, often driven by Messianism.

In Jaffa, where the European and North African migrants arrived by ship, a vibrant commercial community developed in which Ashkenazi and Sephardi Jews inter-mingled. An agricultural school, the Mikveh Israel, was founded near Jaffa by the Alliance Israelite Universelle, a French Jewish association.

The migrants and the Haskalah led to a revival of the Hebrew language and Palestine attracted Jews of all kinds; Adventurous, religious, secular, nationalist and left-wing socialists. Socialists aimed to reclaim the land by becoming peasants or workers and forming self-sustaining collectives. By 1890, Jews were a majority in Jerusalem, although the country as a whole was populated mainly by Muslim and Christian Arabs.

Birth of Zionism

In 1896 Theodor Herzl published Der Judenstaat (The Jewish State), in which he asserted that the solution to growing antisemitism in Europe (the so-called "Jewish Question") was to establish a Jewish state. In 1897, the World Zionist Organization was founded and the First Zionist Congress proclaimed its aim "to establish a home for the Jewish people in Palestine secured under public law."

Between 1904 and 1914, around 40,000 Jews settled in the area now known as Israel (the Second Aliyah). In 1908 the World Zionist Organization set up the Palestine Bureau (also known as the "Eretz Israel Office") in Jaffa and began to adopt a systematic Jewish settlement policy. In 1909 residents of Jaffa bought land outside the city walls and built the first entirely Hebrew-speaking town, Ahuzat Bayit (later renamed Tel Aviv).

In 1915-1916 Talaat Pasha of the Young Turks forced around a million Armenian Christians from their homes in Eastern Turkey, marching them south through Syria, in what is now known as the Armenian genocide. The number of dead is though to be around 700,000. Hundreds of thousands were forcibly converted to Islam.  A community of survivors settled in Jerusalem, one of whom developed the now iconic Armenian pottery.

World War I

During World War I, most Jews supported the Germans because they were fighting the Russians who were regarded as the Jews' main enemy. In Britain, the government sought Jewish support for the war effort for a variety of reasons including an antisemitic perception of "Jewish power" in the Ottoman Empire's Young Turks movement which was based in Thessaloniki, the most Jewish city in Europe (40% of the 160,000 population were Jewish). The British also hoped to secure American Jewish support for US intervention on Britain's behalf.

There was already sympathy for the aims of Zionism in the British government, including the Prime Minister Lloyd George. Over 14,000 Jews were expelled by the Ottoman military commander from the Jaffa area in 1914–1915, due to suspicions they were subjects of Russia, an enemy, or Zionists wishing to detach Palestine from the Ottoman Empire, and when the entire population, including Muslims, of both Jaffa and Tel Aviv was subject to an expulsion order in April 1917, the affected Jews could not return until the British conquest ended in 1918, which drove the Turks out of Southern Syria. A year prior, in 1917, the British foreign minister, Arthur Balfour, sent a public letter to the British Lord Rothschild, a leading member of his party and leader of the Jewish community. The letter subsequently became known as the Balfour Declaration. It stated that the British Government "view[ed] with favour the establishment in Palestine of a national home for the Jewish people". The declaration provided the British government with a pretext for claiming and governing the country. New Middle Eastern boundaries were decided by an agreement between British and French bureaucrats.

A Jewish Legion composed largely of Zionist volunteers organized by Ze'ev Jabotinsky and Joseph Trumpeldor participated in the British invasion. It also participated in the failed Gallipoli Campaign. The Nili Zionist spy network provided the British with details of Ottoman plans and troop concentrations.

Interregnum (1917–1920)

After pushing out the Ottomans, Palestine came under martial law. The British, French and Arab Occupied Enemy Territory Administration governed the area shortly before the armistice with the Ottomans until the promulgation of the mandate in 1920.

 British Mandate of Palestine (1920–1948) 

First years

The British Mandate (in effect, British rule) of Palestine, including the Balfour Declaration, was confirmed by the League of Nations in 1922 and came into effect in 1923. The territory of Transjordan was also covered by the Mandate but under separate rules that excluded it from the Balfour Declaration. Britain signed a treaty with the United States (which did not join the League of Nations) in which the United States endorsed the terms of the Mandate.

The Balfour declaration was published on the 2nd of November 1917 and the Bolsheviks seized control of Russia a week later. This led to civil war in the Russian Empire. Between 1918 and 1921, a series of pogroms led to the death of at least 100,000 Jews (mainly in what is now Ukraine), and the displacement as refugees of a further 600,000. This led to further migration to Palestine.Maurice Wolftal, introduction to Nokhem Shtif,The Pogroms in Ukraine, 1918-19: Prelude to the Holocaust,  Open Book Publishers, 2019.  Between 1919 and 1923, some 40,000 Jews arrived in Palestine in what is known as the Third Aliyah. Many of the Jewish immigrants of this period were Socialist Zionists and supported the Bolsheviks. The migrants became known as pioneers (halutzim), experienced or trained in agriculture who established self-sustaining communes called Kibbutzim. Malarial marshes in the Jezreel Valley and Hefer Plain were drained and converted to agricultural use. Land was bought by the Jewish National Fund, a Zionist charity that collected money abroad for that purpose.

After the French victory over the Arab Kingdom of Syria ended hopes of Arab independence, there were clashes between Arabs and Jews in Jerusalem during the 1920 Nebi Musa riots and in Jaffa the following year, leading to the establishment of the Haganah underground Jewish militia.
A Jewish Agency was created which issued the entry permits granted by the British and distributed funds donated by Jews abroad. Between 1924 and 1929, over 80,000 Jews arrived in the Fourth Aliyah, fleeing antisemitism and heavy tax burdens imposed on trade in Poland and Hungary, inspired by Zionism and motivated by the closure of United States borders by the Immigration Act of 1924 which severely limited immigration from Eastern and Southern Europe.

Pinhas Rutenberg, a former Commissar of St Petersburg in Russia's pre-Bolshevik Kerensky Government, built the first electricity generators in Palestine. In 1925 the Jewish Agency established the Hebrew University in Jerusalem and the Technion (technological university) in Haifa. British authorities introduced the Palestine pound (worth 1000 "mils") in 1927, replacing the Egyptian pound as the unit of currency in the Mandate.

From 1928, the democratically elected Va'ad Leumi (Jewish National Council or JNC) became the main administrative institution of the Palestine Jewish community (Yishuv) and included non-Zionist Jews. As the Yishuv grew, the JNC adopted more government-type functions, such as education, health care and security. With British permission, the Va'ad Leumi raised its own taxes and ran independent services for the Jewish population.

In 1929 tensions grew over the Kotel (Wailing Wall), the holiest spot in the world for Modern Judaism, which was then a narrow alleyway where the British banned Jews from using chairs or curtains: Many of the worshippers were elderly and needed seats; they also wanted to separate women from men. The Mufti of Jerusalem claimed it was Muslim property and deliberately had cattle driven through the alley. He alleged that the Jews were seeking control of the Temple Mount. This provided the spark for the August 1929 Palestine riots. The main victims were the (non-Zionist) ancient Jewish community at Hebron, who were massacred. The riots led to right-wing Zionists establishing their own militia in 1931, the Irgun Tzvai Leumi (National Military Organization, known in Hebrew by its acronym "Etzel"), which was committed to a more aggressive policy towards the Arab population.

During the interwar period, the perception grew that there was an irreconciliable tension between the two Mandatory functions, of providing for a Jewish homeland in Palestine, and the goal of preparing the country for self-determination. The British rejected the principle of majority rule or any other measure that would give the Arab population, who formed the majority of the population, control over Palestinian territory.

Increase of Jewish immigration

In 1933, the Jewish Agency and the Nazis negotiated the Ha'avara Agreement (transfer agreement), under which 50,000 German Jews would be transferred to Palestine. The Jews' possessions were confiscated and in return the Nazis allowed the Ha'avara organization to purchase 14 million pounds worth of German goods for export to Palestine and use it to compensate the immigrants. Although many Jews wanted to leave Nazi Germany, the Nazis prevented Jews from taking any money and restricted them to two suitcases so few could pay the British entry tax and many were afraid to leave. The agreement was controversial and the Labour Zionist leader who negotiated the agreement, Haim Arlosoroff, was assassinated in Tel Aviv in 1933. The assassination was used by the British to create tension between the Zionist left and the Zionist right. Arlosoroff had been the boyfriend of Magda Ritschel some years before she married Joseph Goebbels. There has been speculation that he was assassinated by the Nazis to hide the connection but there is no evidence for it.

Between 1929 and 1938, 250,000 Jews arrived in Palestine (Fifth Aliyah). 174,000 arrived between 1933 and 1936, despite large sums the British demanded for immigration permits: Jews had to prove they had 1,000 pounds (families with capital), 500 pounds if they had a profession and 250 pounds if they were skilled labourers. After 1938, the British tried to prevent immigration, mostly due to the outbreak of the 1936-1939 Arab Revolt. Migrants were mainly from Germany and included professionals, doctors, lawyers and professors. German-Jewish architects built in the Bauhaus style made Tel-Aviv the world's only city with purely Bauhaus neighbourhoods and Palestine had the highest per-capita percentage of doctors in the world.

Fascist regimes were emerging across Europe and persecution of Jews increased. In many countries (most notably the 1935 German Nuremberg laws), Jews reverted to being non-citizens deprived of civil and economic rights, subject to arbitrary persecution. Significantly antisemitic governments came to power in Poland (the government increasingly boycotted Jews and by 1937 had totally excluded all Jews), Hungary, Romania and the Nazi created states of Croatia and Slovakia, while Germany annexed Austria in 1938 and the Czech territories (starting with the Sudetenland in 1938). With each annexation more Jews came under Nazi control.

Arab revolt and the White Paper

Jewish immigration and Nazi propaganda contributed to the large-scale 1936–1939 Arab revolt in Palestine, a largely nationalist uprising directed at ending British rule. The head of the Jewish Agency, Ben-Gurion, responded to the Arab Revolt with a policy of "Havlagah"—self-restraint and a refusal to be provoked by Arab attacks in order to prevent polarization. The Etzel group broke off from the Haganah in opposition to this policy.

The British responded to the revolt with the Peel Commission (1936–37), a public inquiry that recommended that an exclusively Jewish territory be created in the Galilee and western coast (including the population transfer of 225,000 Arabs); the rest becoming an exclusively Arab area. The two main Jewish leaders, Chaim Weizmann and David Ben-Gurion, had convinced the Zionist Congress to approve equivocally the Peel recommendations as a basis for more negotiation.Benny Morris, One state, two states: resolving the Israel/Palestine conflict, 2009, p. 66. The plan was rejected outright by the Palestinian Arab leadership and they renewed the revolt, which caused the British to appease the Arabs, and to abandon the plan as unworkable.: p. 11, "The AHC renewed the revolt. Whitehall ... took vigorous steps to appease the Palestinians."

Testifying before the Peel Commission, Weizmann said "There are in Europe 6,000,000 people ... for whom the world is divided into places where they cannot live and places where they cannot enter." In 1938, the US called an international conference to address the question of the vast numbers of Jews trying to escape Europe. Britain made its attendance contingent on Palestine being kept out of the discussion. No Jewish representatives were invited. The Nazis proposed their own solution: that the Jews of Europe be shipped to Madagascar (the Madagascar Plan). The agreement proved fruitless, and the Jews were stuck in Europe.

With millions of Jews trying to leave Europe and every country in the world closed to Jewish migration, the British decided to close Palestine. The White Paper of 1939, recommended that an independent Palestine, governed jointly by Arabs and Jews, be established within 10 years. The White Paper agreed to allow 75,000 Jewish immigrants into Palestine over the period 1940–44, after which migration would require Arab approval. Both the Arab and Jewish leadership rejected the White Paper. In March 1940 the British High Commissioner for Palestine issued an edict banning Jews from purchasing land in 95% of Palestine. Jews now resorted to illegal immigration: (Aliyah Bet or "Ha'apalah"), often organized by the Mossad Le'aliyah Bet and the Irgun. With no outside help and no countries ready to admit them, very few Jews managed to escape Europe between 1939 and 1945. Those caught by the British were mostly imprisoned in Mauritius.

World War II and the Holocaust

During the Second World War, the Jewish Agency worked to establish a Jewish army that would fight alongside the British forces. Churchill supported the plan but British Military and government opposition led to its rejection. The British demanded that the number of Jewish recruits match the number of Arab recruits, but few Arabs would fight for Britain, and the Palestinian leader, the Mufti of Jerusalem, allied with Nazi Germany.

In June 1940, Italy declared war on the British Commonwealth and sided with Germany. Within a month, Italian planes bombed Tel Aviv and Haifa, inflicting multiple casualties. In May 1941, the Palmach was established to defend the Yishuv against the planned Axis invasion through North Africa. The British refusal to provide arms to the Jews, even when Rommel's forces were advancing through Egypt in June 1942 (intent on occupying Palestine) and the 1939 White Paper, led to the emergence of a Zionist leadership in Palestine that believed conflict with Britain was inevitable. Despite this, the Jewish Agency called on Palestine's Jewish youth to volunteer for the British Army (both men and women). 30,000 Palestinian Jews and 12,000 Palestinian Arabs enlisted in the British armed forces during the war. In June 1944 the British agreed to create a Jewish Brigade that would fight in Italy.

Approximately 1.5 million Jews around the world served in every branch of the allied armies, mainly in the Soviet and US armies. 200,000 Jews died serving in the Soviet army alone. Many of these war veterans later volunteered to fight for Israel or were active in its support.

A small group (about 200 activists), dedicated to resisting the British administration in Palestine, broke away from the Etzel (which advocated support for Britain during the war) and formed the "Lehi" (Stern Gang), led by Avraham Stern. In 1943, the USSR released the Revisionist Zionist leader Menachem Begin from the Gulag and he went to Palestine, taking command of the Etzel organization with a policy of increased conflict against the British. At about the same time Yitzhak Shamir escaped from the camp in Eritrea where the British were holding Lehi activists without trial, taking command of the Lehi (Stern Gang).

Jews in the Middle East were also affected by the war. Most of North Africa came under Nazi control and many Jews were used as slaves. The 1941 pro-Axis coup in Iraq was accompanied by massacres of Jews. The Jewish Agency put together plans for a last stand in the event of Rommel invading Palestine (the Nazis planned to exterminate Palestine's Jews).

Between 1939 and 1945, the Nazis, aided by local forces, led systematic efforts to kill every person of Jewish extraction in Europe (The Holocaust), causing the deaths of approximately 6 million Jews. A quarter of those killed were children. The Polish and German Jewish communities, which played an important role in defining the pre-1945 Jewish world, mostly ceased to exist. In the United States and Palestine, Jews of European origin became disconnected from their families and roots. As the Holocaust mainly affected Ashkenazi Jews, Sepharadi and Mizrahi Jews, who had been a minority, became a much more significant factor in the Jewish world. Those Jews who survived in central Europe, were displaced persons (refugees); an Anglo-American Committee of Inquiry, established to examine the Palestine issue, surveyed their ambitions and found that over 95% wanted to migrate to Palestine.

In the Zionist movement the moderate Pro-British (and British citizen) Weizmann, whose son died flying in the RAF, was undermined by Britain's anti-Zionist policies. Leadership of the movement passed to the Jewish Agency in Palestine, now led by the anti-British Socialist-Zionist party (Mapai) led by David Ben-Gurion. In the diaspora, US Jews now dominated the Zionist movement.

Illegal Jewish immigration and insurgency

The British Empire was severely weakened by the war. In the Middle East, the war had made Britain conscious of its dependence on Arab oil. British firms controlled Iraqi oil and Britain ruled Kuwait, Bahrain and the Emirates. Shortly after VE Day, the Labour Party won the general election in Britain. Although Labour Party conferences had for years called for the establishment of a Jewish state in Palestine, the Labour government now decided to maintain the 1939 White Paper policies.

Illegal migration (Aliyah Bet) became the main form of Jewish entry into Palestine. Across Europe Bricha ("flight"), an organization of former partisans and ghetto fighters, smuggled Holocaust survivors from Eastern Europe to Mediterranean ports, where small boats tried to breach the British blockade of Palestine. Meanwhile, Jews from Arab countries began moving into Palestine overland. Despite British efforts to curb immigration, during the 14 years of the Aliyah Bet, over 110,000 Jews entered Palestine. By the end of World War II, the Jewish population of Palestine had increased to 33% of the total population.

In an effort to win independence, Zionists now waged a guerrilla war against the British. The main underground Jewish militia, the Haganah, formed an alliance called the Jewish Resistance Movement with the Etzel and Stern Gang to fight the British. In June 1946, following instances of Jewish sabotage, the British launched Operation Agatha, arresting 2,700 Jews, including the leadership of the Jewish Agency, whose headquarters were raided. Those arrested were held without trial.

On 4 July 1946 a massive pogrom in Poland led to a wave of Holocaust survivors fleeing Europe for Palestine. Three weeks later, Irgun bombed the British Military Headquarters of the King David Hotel in Jerusalem, killing 91 people. In the days following the bombing, Tel Aviv was placed under curfew and over 120,000 Jews, nearly 20% of the Jewish population of Palestine, were questioned by the police. In the US, Congress criticized British handling of the situation and considered delaying loans that were vital to British post-war recovery. The alliance between Haganah and Etzel was dissolved after the King David bombings.

Between 1945 and 1948, 100,000–120,000 Jews left Poland. Their departure was largely organized by Zionist activists in Poland under the umbrella of the semi-clandestine organization Berihah ("Flight"). Berihah was also responsible for the organized emigration of Jews from Romania, Hungary, Czechoslovakia and Yugoslavia, totalling 250,000 (including Poland) Holocaust survivors. The British imprisoned the Jews trying to enter Palestine in the Atlit detainee camp and Cyprus internment camps. Those held were mainly Holocaust survivors, including large numbers of children and orphans. In response to Cypriot fears that the Jews would never leave (since they lacked a state or documentation) and because the 75,000 quota established by the 1939 White Paper had never been filled, the British allowed the refugees to enter Palestine at a rate of 750 per month.

By 1947 the Labour Government was ready to refer the Palestine problem to the newly created United Nations.

United Nations Partition Plan

On 2 April 1947, the United Kingdom requested that the question of Palestine be handled by the General Assembly. The General Assembly created a committee, United Nations Special Committee on Palestine (UNSCOP), to report on "the question of Palestine". In July 1947 the UNSCOP visited Palestine and met with Jewish and Zionist delegations. The Arab Higher Committee boycotted the meetings. During the visit the British Foreign Secretary Ernest Bevin ordered that passengers from an Aliyah Bet ship,  1947, to be sent back to Europe. The Holocaust surviving migrants on the ship were forcibly removed by British troops at Hamburg, Germany.

The principal non-Zionist Orthodox Jewish (or Haredi) party, Agudat Israel, recommended to UNSCOP that a Jewish state be set up after reaching a religious status quo agreement with Ben-Gurion regarding the future Jewish state. The agreement granted an exemption from military service to a quota of yeshiva (religious seminary) students and to all orthodox women, made the Sabbath the national weekend, guaranteed Kosher food in government institutions and allowed Orthodox Jews to maintain a separate education system.

The majority report of UNSCOP proposed "an independent Arab State, an independent Jewish State, and the City of Jerusalem", the last to be under "an International Trusteeship System". On 29 November 1947, in Resolution 181 (II), the General Assembly adopted the majority report of UNSCOP, but with slight modifications. The Plan also called for the British to allow "substantial" Jewish migration by 1 February 1948.

Neither Britain nor the UN Security Council took any action to implement the recommendation made by the resolution and Britain continued detaining Jews attempting to enter Palestine. Concerned that partition would severely damage Anglo-Arab relations, Britain denied UN representatives access to Palestine during the period between the adoption of Resolution 181 (II) and the termination of the British Mandate. The British withdrawal was finally completed in May 1948. However, Britain continued to hold (formerly illegal) Jewish immigrants of "fighting age" and their families on Cyprus until March 1949.

Civil War

The General Assembly's vote caused joy in the Jewish community and anger in the Arab community. Violence broke out between the sides, escalating into civil war. From January 1948, operations became increasingly militarized, with the intervention of a number of Arab Liberation Army regiments inside Palestine, each active in a variety of distinct sectors around the different coastal towns. They consolidated their presence in Galilee and Samaria. Abd al-Qadir al-Husayni came from Egypt with several hundred men of the Army of the Holy War. Having recruited a few thousand volunteers, he organized the blockade of the 100,000 Jewish residents of Jerusalem. The Yishuv tried to supply the city using convoys of up to 100 armoured vehicles, but largely failed. By March, almost all Haganah's armoured vehicles had been destroyed, the blockade was in full operation, and hundreds of Haganah members who had tried to bring supplies into the city were killed.

Up to 100,000 Arabs, from the urban upper and middle classes in Haifa, Jaffa and Jerusalem, or Jewish-dominated areas, evacuated abroad or to Arab centres eastwards. This situation caused the US to withdraw their support for the Partition plan, thus encouraging the Arab League to believe that the Palestinian Arabs, reinforced by the Arab Liberation Army, could put an end to the plan for partition. The British, on the other hand, decided on 7 February 1948 to support the annexation of the Arab part of Palestine by Transjordan. The Jordanian army was commanded by the British.

David Ben-Gurion reorganized the Haganah and made conscription obligatory. Every Jewish man and woman in the country had to receive military training. Thanks to funds raised by Golda Meir from sympathisers in the United States, and Stalin's decision to support the Zionist cause, the Jewish representatives of Palestine were able to purchase important arms in Eastern Europe.

Ben-Gurion gave Yigael Yadin the responsibility to plan for the announced intervention of the Arab states. The result of his analysis was Plan Dalet, in which Haganah passed from the defensive to the offensive. The plan sought to establish Jewish territorial continuity by conquering mixed zones. Tiberias, Haifa, Safed, Beisan, Jaffa and Acre fell, resulting in the flight of more than 250,000 Palestinian Arabs. The situation was one of the catalysts for the intervention of neighbouring Arab states.

On 14 May 1948, on the day the last British forces left from Haifa, the Jewish People's Council gathered at the Tel Aviv Museum and proclaimed the establishment of a Jewish state in Eretz Israel, to be known as the State of Israel.

State of Israel (1948–present)

War of Independence

Immediately following the declaration of the new state, both superpower leaders, US President Harry S. Truman and Soviet leader Joseph Stalin, recognized the new state. The Arab League members Egypt, Transjordan, Syria, Lebanon and Iraq refused to accept the UN partition plan and proclaimed the right of self-determination for the Arabs across the whole of Palestine. The Arab states marched their forces into what had, until the previous day, been the British Mandate for Palestine, starting the first Arab–Israeli War. The Arab states had heavy military equipment at their disposal and were initially on the offensive (the Jewish forces were not a state before 15 May and could not buy heavy arms). On 29 May 1948, the British initiated United Nations Security Council Resolution 50 declaring an arms embargo on the region. Czechoslovakia violated the resolution, supplying the Jewish state with critical military hardware to match the (mainly British) heavy equipment and planes already owned by the invading Arab states. On 11 June, a month-long UN truce was put into effect.

Following independence, the Haganah became the Israel Defense Forces (IDF). The Palmach, Etzel and Lehi were required to cease independent operations and join the IDF. During the ceasefire, Etzel attempted to bring in a private arms shipment aboard a ship called "Altalena". When they refused to hand the arms to the government, Ben-Gurion ordered that the ship be sunk. Several Etzel members were killed in the fighting.

Large numbers of Jewish immigrants, many of them World War II veterans and Holocaust survivors, now began arriving in the new state of Israel, and many joined the IDF.

After an initial loss of territory by the Jewish state and its occupation by the Arab armies, from July the tide gradually turned in the Israelis' favour and they pushed the Arab armies out and conquered some of the territory that had been included in the proposed Arab state. At the end of November, tenuous local ceasefires were arranged between the Israelis, Syrians and Lebanese. On 1 December King Abdullah announced the union of Transjordan with Arab Palestine west of the Jordan; only Britain recognized the annexation.

Armistice Agreements

Israel signed armistices with Egypt (24 February), Lebanon (23 March), Jordan (3 April) and Syria (20 July). No actual peace agreements were signed. With permanent ceasefire coming into effect, Israel's new borders, later known as the Green Line, were established. These borders were not recognized by the Arab states as international boundaries. Israel was in control of the Galilee, Jezreel Valley, West Jerusalem, the coastal plain and the Negev. The Syrians remained in control of a strip of territory along the Sea of Galilee originally allocated to the Jewish state, the Lebanese occupied a tiny area at Rosh Hanikra, and the Egyptians retained the Gaza strip and still had some forces surrounded inside Israeli territory. Jordanian forces remained in the West Bank, where the British had stationed them before the war. Jordan annexed the areas it occupied while Egypt kept Gaza as an occupied zone.

Following the ceasefire declaration, Britain released over 2,000 Jewish detainees it was still holding in Cyprus and recognized the state of Israel. On 11 May 1949, Israel was admitted as a member of the United Nations. Out of an Israeli population of 650,000, some 6,000 men and women were killed in the fighting, including 4,000 soldiers in the IDF (approximately 1% of the population). According to United Nations figures, 726,000 Palestinians had fled or were expelled by the Israelis between 1947 and 1949. Except in Jordan, the Palestinian refugees were settled in large refugee camps in poor, overcrowded conditions and denied citizenship by their host countries. In December 1949, the UN (in response to a British proposal) established an agency (UNRWA) to provide aid to the Palestinian refugees. It became the largest single UN agency and is the only UN agency that serves a single people.

1948–1955: Ben-Gurion I; Sharett

A 120-seat parliament, the Knesset, met first in Tel Aviv then moved to Jerusalem after the 1949 ceasefire. In January 1949, Israel held its first elections. The Socialist-Zionist parties Mapai and Mapam won the most seats (46 and 19 respectively). Mapai's leader, David Ben-Gurion, was appointed Prime Minister, he formed a coalition which did not include Mapam who were Stalinist and loyal to the USSR (another Stalinist party, non-Zionist Maki won 4 seats). This was a significant decision, as it signaled that Israel would not be in the Soviet bloc. The Knesset elected Chaim Weizmann as the first (largely ceremonial) President of Israel. Hebrew and Arabic were made the official languages of the new state. All governments have been coalitions—no party has ever won a majority in the Knesset. From 1948 until 1977 all governments were led by Mapai and the Alignment, predecessors of the Labour Party. In those years Labour Zionists, initially led by David Ben-Gurion, dominated Israeli politics and the economy was run on primarily socialist lines.

Within three years (1948 to 1951), immigration doubled the Jewish population of Israel and left an indelible imprint on Israeli society. Overall, 700,000 Jews settled in Israel during this period. Some 300,000 arrived from Asian and North African nations as part of the Jewish exodus from Arab and Muslim countries. Among them, the largest group (over 100,000) was from Iraq. The rest of the immigrants were from Europe, including more than 270,000 who came from Eastern Europe, mainly Romania and Poland (over 100,000 each). Nearly all the Jewish immigrants could be described as refugees, however only 136,000 who immigrated to Israel from Central Europe, had international certification because they belonged to the 250,000 Jews registered by the allies as displaced after World War II and living in displaced persons camps in Germany, Austria and Italy.

In 1950 the Knesset passed the Law of Return, which granted to all Jews and those of Jewish ancestry (Jewish grandparent), and their spouses, the right to settle in Israel and gain citizenship. That year, 50,000 Yemenite Jews (99%) were secretly flown to Israel. In 1951 Iraqi Jews were granted temporary permission to leave the country and 120,000 (over 90%) opted to move to Israel. Jews also fled from Lebanon, Syria and Egypt. By the late sixties, about 500,000 Jews had left Algeria, Morocco and Tunisia. Over the course of twenty years, some 850,000 Jews from Arab countries (99%) relocated to Israel (680,000), France and the Americas. The land and property left behind by the Jews (much of it in Arab city centres) is still a matter of some dispute. Today there are about 9,000 Jews living in Arab states, of whom 75% live in Morocco and 15% in Tunisia. Vast assets, approximately $150 billion worth of goods and property (before inflation) were left behind in these countries.

Between 1948 and 1958, the population of Israel rose from 800,000 to two million. During this period, food, clothes and furniture had to be rationed in what became known as the Austerity Period (Tkufat haTsena). Immigrants were mostly refugees with no money or possessions and many were housed in temporary camps known as ma'abarot. By 1952, over 200,000 immigrants were living in tents or prefabricated shacks built by the government. Israel received financial aid from private donations from outside the country (mainly the United States). The pressure on the new state's finances led Ben-Gurion to sign a controversial reparations agreement with West Germany. During the Knesset debate some 5,000 demonstrators gathered and riot police had to cordon the building. Israel received several billion marks and in return agreed to open diplomatic relations with Germany.

At the end of 1953, Ben-Gurion retired to Kibbutz Sde Boker in the Negev.

In 1949, education was made free and compulsory for all citizens until the age of 14. The state now funded the party-affiliated Zionist education system and a new body created by the Haredi Agudat Israel party. A separate body was created to provide education for the remaining Palestinian-Arab population. The major political parties now competed for immigrants to join their education systems. The government banned the existing educational bodies from the transit camps and tried to mandate a unitary secular socialist education under the control of "camp managers" who also had to provide work, food and housing for the immigrants. There were attempts to force orthodox Yemenite children to adopt a secular life style by teachers, including many instances of Yemenite children having their side-curls cut by teachers. The Yemenite children affair led to the first Israeli public inquiry (the Fromkin Inquiry), the collapse of the coalition, and an election in 1951, with little change in the results. In 1953 the party-affiliated education system was scrapped and replaced by a secular state education system and a state-run Modern Orthodox system. Agudat Israel were allowed to maintain their existing school system.

In its early years Israel sought to maintain a non-aligned position between the super-powers. However, in 1952, an antisemitic public trial was staged in Moscow in which a group of Jewish doctors were accused of trying to poison Stalin (the Doctors' plot), followed by a similar trial in Czechoslovakia (Slánský trial). This, and the failure of Israel to be included in the Bandung Conference (of non-aligned states), effectively ended Israel's pursuit of non-alignment. On 19 May 1950, in contravention of international law, Egypt announced that the Suez Canal was closed to Israeli ships and commerce. In 1952 a military coup in Egypt brought Abdel Nasser to power. The United States pursued close relations with the new Arab states, particularly the Nasser-led Egyptian Free Officers Movement and Ibn Saud of Saudi Arabia. Israel's solution to diplomatic isolation was to establish good relations with newly independent states in Africa and with France, which was engaged in the Algerian War.

In the January 1955 elections Mapai won 40 seats and the Labour Party 10, Moshe Sharett became prime minister of Israel at the head of a left-wing coalition. Between 1953 and 1956, there were intermittent clashes along all of Israel's borders as Arab terrorism and breaches of the ceasefire resulting in Israeli counter-raids. Palestinian fedayeen attacks, often organized and sponsored by the Egyptians, were made from (Egyptian) occupied Gaza. Fedayeen attacks led to a growing cycle of violence as Israel launched reprisal attacks against Gaza. In 1954 the Uzi submachine gun first entered use by the Israel Defense Forces. In 1955 the Egyptian government began recruiting former Nazi rocket scientists for a missile program.Nasser and the Missile Age in the Middle East (Contemporary Security Studies) by Owen Sirrs, Routledge 2006. . The Germans involved had worked on the V-1 and V-2 programs.

Archaeologist and General Yigael Yadin purchased the Dead Sea Scrolls on behalf of the State of Israel. The entire first batch to be discovered were now owned by Israel and housed in the Shrine of the Book at the Israel Museum.

Sharett's government was brought down by the Lavon Affair, a crude plan to disrupt US–Egyptian relations, involving Israeli agents planting bombs at American sites in Egypt. The plan failed when eleven agents were arrested. Defense Minister Lavon was blamed despite his denial of responsibility. The Lavon affair led to Sharett's resignation and Ben-Gurion returned to the post of prime minister.

1955–1963: Ben-Gurion II

In 1955 Egypt concluded a massive arms deal with Czechoslovakia, upsetting the balance of power in the Middle East. In 1956, the increasingly pro-Soviet President Nasser of Egypt, announced the nationalization of the (French and British owned) Suez Canal, which was Egypt's main source of foreign currency. Egypt also blockaded the Gulf of Aqaba preventing Israeli access to the Red Sea. Israel made a secret agreement with the French at Sèvres to co-ordinate military operations against Egypt. Britain and France had already begun secret preparations for military action. It has been alleged that the French also agreed to build a nuclear plant for the Israelis and that by 1968 this was able to produce nuclear weapons. Britain and France arranged for Israel to give them a pretext for seizing the Suez Canal. Israel was to attack Egypt, and Britain and France would then call on both sides to withdraw. When, as expected, the Egyptians refused, Anglo-French forces would invade to take control of the Canal.

Israeli forces, commanded by General Moshe Dayan, attacked Egypt on 29 October 1956. On 30 October Britain and France made their pre-arranged call for both sides to stop fighting and withdraw from the Canal area, and for them to be allowed to take up positions at key points on the Canal. Egypt refused and the allies commenced air strikes on 31 October aimed at neutralizing the Egyptian air force. By 5 November the Israelis had overrun the Sinai. The Anglo-French invasion began that day. There was uproar in the UN, with the United States and USSR for once in agreement in denouncing the actions of Israel, Britain and France. A demand for a ceasefire was reluctantly accepted on 7 November.

At Egypt's request, the UN sent an Emergency Force (UNEF), consisting of 6,000 peacekeeping troops from 10 nations to supervise the ceasefire. This was the first ever UN peacekeeping operation. From 15 November the UN troops marked out a zone across the Sinai to separate the Israeli and Egyptian forces. Upon receiving US guarantees of Israeli access to the Suez Canal, freedom of access out of the Gulf of Aqaba and Egyptian action to stop Palestinian raids from Gaza, the Israelis withdrew to the Negev. In practice the Suez Canal remained closed to Israeli shipping. The conflict marked the end of West-European dominance in the Middle East.

Nasser emerged as the victor in the conflict, having won the political battle, however the Israeli military learnt that it did not need British or French support in order to conquer Sinai and that it could conquer the Sinai peninsula in a few days. The Israeli political leadership learnt that Israel had a limited time frame within which to operate militarily after which international political pressure would restrict Israel's freedom of action.

In 1956, two modern-orthodox (and religious-zionist) parties, Mizrachi and Hapoel HaMizrachi, joined to form the National Religious Party. The party was a component of every Israeli coalition until 1992, usually running the Ministry of Education. Mapai was once again victorious in the 1959 elections, increasing its number of seats to 47, Labour had 7. Ben-Gurion remained Prime Minister.

In 1959, there were renewed skirmishes along Israel's borders that continued throughout the early 1960s. The Arab League continued to widener its economic boycott and there was a dispute over water rights in the River Jordan basin. With Soviet backing, the Arab states, particularly Egypt, were continuing to build up their forces. Israel's main military hardware supplier was France.

Rudolph Kastner, a minor political functionary, was accused of collaborating with the Nazis and sued his accuser. Kastner lost the trial and was assassinated two years later. In 1958 the Supreme Court exonerated him. In May 1960 Adolf Eichmann, one of the chief administrators of the Nazi Holocaust, was located in Argentina by the Mossad, later kidnapping him and bringing him to Israel. In 1961 he was put on trial, and after several months found guilty and sentenced to death. He was hanged in 1962 and is the only person ever sentenced to death by an Israeli court. Testimonies by Holocaust survivors at the trial and the extensive publicity that surrounded it has led the trial to be considered a turning point in public awareness of the Holocaust.

In 1961 a Herut no-confidence motion over the resurfaced Lavon affair led to Ben-Gurion's resignation. Ben-Gurion declared that he would only accept office if Lavon was fired from the position of the head of Histadrut, Israel's labour union organization. His demands were accepted and Mapai won the 1961 election (42 seats keeping Ben-Gurion as PM) with a slight reduction in its share of the seats. Menachem Begin's Herut party and the Liberals came next with 17 seats each. In 1962 the Mossad began assassinating German rocket scientists working in Egypt after one of them reported the missile program was designed to carry chemical warheads. This action was condemned by Ben-Gurion and led to the Mossad director, Isser Harel, resignation. In 1963 Ben-Gurion quit again over the Lavon affair. His attempts to make his party Mapai support him over the issue failed. Levi Eshkol became leader of Mapai and the new prime minister.

1963–1969: Eshkol

In 1963 Yigael Yadin began excavating Masada. In 1964, Egypt, Jordan and Syria developed a unified military command. Israel completed work on a national water carrier, a huge engineering project designed to transfer Israel's allocation of the Jordan river's waters towards the south of the country in realization of Ben-Gurion's dream of mass Jewish settlement of the Negev desert. The Arabs responded by trying to divert the headwaters of the Jordan, leading to growing conflict between Israel and Syria.

In 1964, Israeli Rabbinical authorities accepted that the Bene Israel of India were indeed Jewish and most of the remaining Indian Jews migrated to Israel. The 2,000-strong Jewish community of Cochin had already migrated in 1954. Ben-Gurion quit Mapai to form the new party Rafi, he was joined by Shimon Peres and Moshe Dayan. Begin's Herut party joined with the Liberals to form Gahal. Mapai and Labour united for the 1965 elections, winning 45 seats and maintaining Levi Eshkol as Prime Minister. Ben-Gurion's Rafi party received 10 seats, Gahal got 26 seats becoming the second largest party.

Until 1966, Israel's principal arms supplier was France, however in 1966, following the withdrawal from Algeria, Charles de Gaulle announced France would cease supplying Israel with arms (and refused to refund money paid for 50 warplanes). On 5 February 1966, the United States announced that it was taking over the former French and West German obligations, to maintain military "stabilization" in the Middle East. Included in the military hardware would be over 200 M48 tanks. In May of that year the US also agreed to provide A-4 Skyhawk tactical aircraft to Israel. In 1966 security restrictions placed on Arab-Israelis were eased and efforts made to integrate them into Israeli life.

In 1966, Black and white TV broadcasts began. On 15 May 1967, the first public performance of Naomi Shemer's classic song "Jerusalem of Gold" took place and over the next few weeks it dominated the Israeli airwaves. Two days later Syria, Egypt and Jordan amassed troops along the Israeli borders, and Egypt closed the Straits of Tiran to Israeli shipping. Nasser demanded that the UNEF leave Sinai, threatening escalation to a full war. Egyptian radio broadcasts talked of a coming genocide. On 26 May Nasser declared, "The battle will be a general one and our basic objective will be to destroy Israel". Israel considered the Straits of Tiran closure a Casus belli. Egypt, Syria, Jordan and Iraq signed defence pacts and Iraqi troops began deploying to Jordan, Syria and Egypt. Algeria also announced that it would send troops to Egypt. Between 1963 and 1967 Egyptian troops had tested chemical weapons on Yemenite civilians as part of an Egyptian intervention in support of rebels.

Israel responded by calling up its civilian reserves, bringing much of the Israeli economy to a halt. The Israelis set up a national unity coalition, including for the first time Menachem Begin's party, Herut, in a coalition. During a national radio broadcast, Prime Minister Levi Eshkol stammered, causing widespread fear in Israel. To calm public concern Moshe Dayan (Chief of Staff during the Sinai war) was appointed Defence Minister.

On the morning before Dayan was sworn in, 5 June 1967, the Israeli air force launched pre-emptive attacks destroying first the Egyptian air force, and then later the same day destroying the air forces of Jordan and Syria. Israel then defeated (almost successively) Egypt, Jordan and Syria. By 11 June the Arab forces were routed and all parties had accepted the cease-fire called for by UN Security Council Resolutions 235 and 236. Israel gained control of the Sinai Peninsula, the Gaza Strip, the Golan Heights, and the formerly Jordanian-controlled West Bank of the Jordan River. East Jerusalem was arguably annexed by Israel. Residents were given permanent residency status and the option of applying for Israeli citizenship. The annexation was not recognized internationally (the Jordanian annexation of 1950 was also unrecognized except for the UK, Iraq, and Pakistan). Other areas occupied remained under military rule (Israeli civil law did not apply to them) pending a final settlement. The Golan was also annexed in 1981.

The result of the 29 August 1967 Arab League summit was the Khartoum Resolution, which according to Abd al Azim Ramadan, left only one option -a war with Israel. On 22 November 1967, the Security Council adopted Resolution 242, the "land for peace" formula, which called for the establishment of a just and lasting peace based on Israeli withdrawal from territories occupied in 1967 in return for the end of all states of belligerency, respect for the sovereignty of all states in the area, and the right to live in peace within secure, recognized boundaries. The resolution was accepted by both sides, though with different interpretations, and has been the basis of all subsequent peace negotiations.

After 1967 the Soviet block (except Romania) broke off relations with Israel. Antisemitic purges encouraged the remnants of Polish Jewry to move to Israel.

For the first time since the end of the British Mandate, Jews could visit the Old City of Jerusalem and pray at the Western Wall (the holiest site in Judaism), to which they had been denied access by the Jordanians in contravention of the 1949 Armistice agreement. The four-meter-wide public alley beside the Wall was expanded into a massive plaza and worshippers were allowed to sit, or use other furniture, for the first time in centuries. In Hebron, Jews gained access to the Cave of the Patriarchs (the second most holy site in Judaism) for the first time since the 14th century (previously Jews were only allowed to pray at the entrance). A third Jewish holy site, Rachel's Tomb, in Bethlehem, also became accessible. The Sinai oil fields made Israel self-sufficient in energy.

In 1968 Moshe Levinger led a group of Religious Zionists who created the first Jewish settlement, a town near Hebron called Kiryat Arba. There were no other religious settlements until after 1974. Ben-Gurion's Rafi party merged with the Labour-Mapai alliance. Ben-Gurion remained outside as an independent. In 1968, compulsory education was extended until the age of 16 for all citizens (it had been 14) and the government embarked on an extensive program of integration in education. In the major cities children from mainly Sephardi/Mizrahi neighbourhoods were bused to newly established middle schools in better areas. The system remained in place until after 2000.

In March 1968, Israeli forces attacked the Palestinian militia, Fatah, at its base in the Jordanian town of Karameh. The attack was in response to land mines placed on Israeli roads. The Israelis retreated after destroying the camp, however the Israelis sustained unexpectedly high casualties and the attack was not viewed as a success. Despite heavy casualties, the Palestinians claimed victory, while Fatah and the PLO (of which it formed part) became famous across the Arab world. In early 1969, fighting broke out between Egypt and Israel along the Suez Canal. In retaliation for repeated Egyptian shelling of Israeli positions along the Suez Canal, Israeli planes made deep strikes into Egypt in the 1969–1970 "War of Attrition".

1969–1974: Meir

In early 1969, Levi Eshkol died in office of a heart attack and Golda Meir became Prime Minister with the largest percentage of the vote ever won by an Israeli party, winning 56 of the 120 seats after the 1969 election. Meir was the first female prime minister of Israel and the first woman to have headed a Middle Eastern state in modern times. Gahal retained its 26 seats, and was the second largest party.

In December 1969, Israeli naval commandos took five missile boats during the night from Cherbourg Harbour in France. Israel had paid for the boats but the French had refused to supply them. In July 1970 the Israelis shot down five Soviet fighters that were aiding the Egyptians in the course of the War of Attrition. Following this, the US worked to calm the situation and in August 1970 a cease fire was agreed.

In September 1970 King Hussein of Jordan drove the Palestine Liberation Organization out of his country. On 18 September 1970, Syrian tanks invaded Jordan, intending to aid the PLO. At the request of the US, Israel moved troops to the border and threatened Syria, causing the Syrians to withdraw. The centre of PLO activity then shifted to Lebanon, where the 1969 Cairo agreement gave the Palestinians autonomy within the south of the country. The area controlled by the PLO became known by the international press and locals as "Fatahland" and contributed to the 1975–1990 Lebanese Civil War. The event also led to Hafez al-Assad taking power in Syria. Egyptian President Nasser died of a heart attack immediately after and was succeeded by Anwar Sadat.

Increased Soviet antisemitism and enthusiasm generated by the 1967 victory led to a wave of Soviet Jews applying to emigrate to Israel. . Most Jews were refused exit visas and persecuted by the authorities. Some were arrested, becoming known as Prisoners of Zion. During 1971, violent demonstrations by the Israeli Black Panthers, made the Israeli public aware of resentment among Mizrahi Jews at ongoing discrimination and social gaps. In 1972 the US Jewish Mafia leader, Meyer Lansky, who had taken refuge in Israel, was deported to the United States.

At the 1972 Munich Olympics, two members of the Israeli team were killed, and nine members taken hostage by Palestinian terrorists. A botched German rescue attempt led to the death of the rest along with five of the eight hijackers. The three surviving Palestinians were released by the West German authorities eight weeks later without charge, in exchange for the hostages of hijacked Lufthansa Flight 615. The Israeli government responded with an air raid, a raid on the PLO headquarters in Lebanon (led by future Prime Minister, Ehud Barak) and an assassination campaign against the organizers of the massacre.

In 1972 the new Egyptian President Anwar Sadat expelled the Soviet advisers from Egypt. This and frequent invasion exercises by Egypt and Syria led to Israeli complacency about the threat from these countries. In addition the desire not to be held responsible for initiating conflict and an election campaign highlighting security, led to an Israeli failure to mobilize, despite receiving warnings of an impending attack.

The Yom Kippur War (also known as the October War) began on 6 October 1973 (the Jewish Day of Atonement), the holiest day in the Jewish calendar and a day when adult Jews are required to fast. The Syrian and Egyptian armies launched a well-planned surprise attack against the unprepared Israeli Defense Forces. For the first few days there was a great deal of uncertainty about Israel's capacity to repel the invaders. Both the Soviets and the Americans (at the orders of Henry Kissinger) rushed arms to their allies. The Syrians were repulsed by the tiny remnant of the Israeli tank force on the Golan and, although the Egyptians captured a strip of territory in Sinai, Israeli forces crossed the Suez Canal, trapping the Egyptian Third Army in Sinai and were 100 kilometres from Cairo. The war cost Israel over 2,000 dead, resulted in a heavy arms bill (for both sides) and made Israelis more aware of their vulnerability. It also led to heightened superpower tension. Following the war, both Israelis and Egyptians showed greater willingness to negotiate. On 18 January 1974, extensive diplomacy by US Secretary of State Henry Kissinger led to a Disengagement of Forces agreement with the Egyptian government and on 31 May with the Syrian government.

The war was the catalyst for the 1973 oil crisis, a Saudi-led oil embargo in conjunction with OPEC against countries trading with Israel. Severe shortages led to massive increases in the price of oil, and as a result, many countries broke off relations with Israel or downgraded relations, and Israel was banned from participation in the Asian Games and other Asian sporting events.

State funding was introduced for elected parties. The new system made parties independent of wealthy donors and gave Knesset members more power over party funding, however it also made them less dependent on existing party structures and able to take their funding elsewhere. Prior to the December 1973 elections, Gahal and a number of right-wing parties united to form the Likud (led by Begin). In the December 1973 elections, Labour won 51 seats, leaving Golda Meir as Prime Minister. The Likud won 39 seats.

In May 1974, Palestinians attacked a school in Ma'alot, holding 102 children hostage. Twenty-two children were killed. In November 1974 the PLO was granted observer status at the UN and Yasser Arafat addressed the General Assembly. Later that year the Agranat Commission, appointed to assess responsibility for Israel's lack of preparedness for the war, exonerated the government of responsibility, and held the Chief of Staff and head of military intelligence responsible. Despite the report, public anger at the Government led to Golda Meir's resignation.

1974–1977: Rabin I

Following Meir's resignation, Yitzhak Rabin became prime minister. Religious Zionist followers of the teachings of Abraham Isaac Kook, formed the Gush Emunim movement, and began an organized drive to settle the West Bank and Gaza Strip. In November 1975, the United Nations General Assembly, under the guidance of Austrian Secretary General Kurt Waldheim, adopted Resolution 3379, which asserted Zionism to be a form of racism. The General Assembly rescinded this resolution in December 1991 with Resolution 46/86. In March 1976, there was a massive strike by Israeli-Arabs in protest at a government plan to expropriate land in the Galilee.

In July 1976, Rabin ordered Operation Entebbe to rescue kidnapped Jewish passengers from an Air France flight hijacked by PFLP militants and German revolutionaries and flown to Uganda.

In January 1977, French authorities arrested Abu Daoud, the planner of the Munich massacre, releasing him a few days later. In March 1977 Anatoly Sharansky, a prominent Refusenik and spokesman for the Moscow Helsinki Group, was sentenced to 13 years' hard labour.

Rabin resigned in April 1977 after it emerged that his wife maintained a dollar account in the United States (illegal at the time), which had been opened while Rabin was Israeli ambassador. The incident became known as the Dollar Account affair. Shimon Peres informally replaced him as prime minister, leading the Alignment in the subsequent elections.

1977–1983: Begin

In a surprise result, the Likud led by Menachem Begin won 43 seats in the 1977 elections (Labour got 32 seats). This was the first time in Israeli history that the government was not led by the left. A key reason for the victory was anger among Mizrahi Jews at discrimination, which was to play an important role in Israeli politics for many years. Talented small town Mizrahi social activists, unable to advance in the Labour party, were readily embraced by Begin. Moroccan-born David Levy and Iranian-born Moshe Katzav were part of a group who won Mizrahi support for Begin. Many Labour voters voted for the Democratic Movement for Change (15 seats) in protest at high-profile corruption cases. The party joined in coalition with Begin and disappeared at the next election.

In addition to starting a process of healing the Mizrahi–Ashkenazi divide, Begin's government included Ultra-Orthodox Jews and was instrumental in healing the Zionist–Ultra-Orthodox rift.

Begin's liberalization of the economy led to hyper-inflation (around 150% inflation) but enabled Israel to begin receiving US financial aid. Begin actively supported Gush Emunim's efforts to settle the West Bank and Jewish settlements in the occupied territories received government support, thus laying the grounds for intense conflict with the Palestinian population of the occupied territories.

In November 1977, Egyptian President Anwar Sadat broke 30 years of hostility with Israel by visiting Jerusalem at the invitation of Israeli Prime Minister Menachem Begin. Sadat's two-day visit included a speech before the Knesset and was a turning point in the history of the conflict. The Egyptian leader created a new psychological climate in the Middle East in which peace between Israel and its Arab neighbours seemed possible. Sadat recognized Israel's right to exist and established the basis for direct negotiations between Egypt and Israel. Following Sadat's visit, 350 Yom Kippur War veterans organized the Peace Now movement to encourage Israeli governments to make peace with the Arabs.

In March 1978, eleven armed Lebanese Palestinians reached Israel in boats and hijacked a bus carrying families on a day outing, killing 38 people, including 13 children. The attackers opposed the Egyptian–Israeli peace process. Three days later, Israeli forces crossed into Lebanon beginning Operation Litani. After passage of United Nations Security Council Resolution 425, calling for Israeli withdrawal and the creation of the United Nations Interim Force in Lebanon (UNIFIL) peace-keeping force, Israel withdrew its troops.

In September 1978, US President Jimmy Carter invited President Sadat and Prime Minister Begin to meet with him at Camp David, and on 11 September they agreed on a framework for peace between Israel and Egypt, and a comprehensive peace in the Middle East. It set out broad principles to guide negotiations between Israel and the Arab states. It also established guidelines for a West Bank–Gaza transitional regime of full autonomy for the Palestinians residing in these territories, and for a peace treaty between Egypt and Israel. The treaty was signed 26 March 1979 by Begin and Sadat, with President Carter signing as witness. Under the treaty, Israel returned the Sinai peninsula to Egypt in April 1982. The Arab League reacted to the peace treaty by suspending Egypt from the organization and moving its headquarters from Cairo to Tunis. Sadat was assassinated in 1981 by Islamic fundamentalist members of the Egyptian army who opposed peace with Israel. Following the agreement Israel and Egypt became the two largest recipients of US military and financial aid (Iraq and Afghanistan have now overtaken them).

In December 1978 the Israeli Merkava battle tank entered use with the IDF. In 1979, over 40,000 Iranian Jews migrated to Israel, escaping the Islamic Revolution there. On 30 June 1981, the Israeli air force destroyed the Osirak nuclear reactor that France was building for Iraq. Three weeks later, Begin won again, in the 1981 elections (48 seats Likud, 47 Labour). Ariel Sharon was made defence minister. The new government annexed the Golan Heights and banned the national airline from flying on Shabbat. By the 1980s a diverse set of high-tech industries had developed in Israel.

In the decades following the 1948 war, Israel's border with Lebanon was quiet compared to its borders with other neighbours. But the 1969 Cairo agreement gave the PLO a free hand to attack Israel from South Lebanon. The area was governed by the PLO independently of the Lebanese Government and became known as "Fatahland" (Fatah was the largest faction in the PLO). Palestinian irregulars constantly shelled the Israeli north, especially the town of Kiryat Shmona, which was a Likud stronghold inhabited primarily by Jews who had fled the Arab world. Lack of control over Palestinian areas was an important factor in causing civil war in Lebanon.

In June 1982, the attempted assassination of Shlomo Argov, the ambassador to Britain, was used as a pretext for an Israeli invasion aiming to drive the PLO out of the southern half of Lebanon. Sharon agreed with Chief of Staff Raphael Eitan to expand the invasion deep into Lebanon even though the cabinet had only authorized a 40 kilometre deep invasion. The invasion became known as the 1982 Lebanon War and the Israeli army occupied Beirut, the only time an Arab capital has been occupied by Israel. Some of the Shia and Christian population of South Lebanon welcomed the Israelis, as PLO forces had maltreated them, but Lebanese resentment of Israeli occupation grew over time and the Shia became gradually radicalized under Iranian guidance. Constant casualties among Israeli soldiers and Lebanese civilians led to growing opposition to the war in Israel.

In August 1982, the PLO withdrew its forces from Lebanon (moving to Tunisia). Bashir Gemayel was elected President of Lebanon, and reportedly agreed to recognize Israel and sign a peace treaty. However, Gemayal was assassinated before an agreement could be signed, and one day later Phalangist Christian forces led by Elie Hobeika entered two Palestinian refugee camps and massacred the occupants. The massacres led to the biggest demonstration ever in Israel against the war, with as many as 400,000 people (almost 10% of the population) gathering in Tel Aviv. In 1983, an Israeli public inquiry found that Israel's defence minister, Sharon, was indirectly but personally responsible for the massacres. It also recommended that he never again be allowed to hold the post (it did not forbid him from being Prime Minister). In 1983, the May 17 Agreement was signed between Israel and Lebanon, paving the way for an Israeli withdrawal from Lebanese territory through a few stages. Israel continued to operate against the PLO until its eventual departure in 1985, and kept a small force stationed in Southern Lebanon in support of the South Lebanon Army until May 2000.

1983–1992: Shamir I; Peres I; Shamir II

In September 1983, Begin resigned and was succeeded by Yitzhak Shamir as prime minister. The 1984 election was inconclusive, and led to a power sharing agreement between Shimon Peres of the Alignment (44 seats) and Shamir of Likud (41 seats). Peres was prime minister from 1984 to 1986 and Shamir from 1986 to 1988. In 1984, continual discrimination against Sephardi Ultra-Orthodox Jews by the Ashkenazi Ultra-Orthodox establishment led political activist Aryeh Deri to leave the Agudat Israel party and join former chief Rabbi Ovadia Yosef in forming Shas, a new party aimed at the non-Ashkenazi Ultra-Orthodox vote. The party won 4 seats in the first election it contested and over the next twenty years was the third largest party in the Knesset. Shas established a nationwide network of free Sephardi Orthodox schools. In 1984, during a severe famine in Ethiopia, 8,000 Ethiopian Jews were secretly transported to Israel. In 1986 Natan Sharansky, a famous Russian human rights activist and Zionist refusenik (denied an exit visa), was released from the Gulag in return for two Soviet spies.

In June 1985, Israel withdrew most of its troops from Lebanon, leaving a residual Israeli force and an Israeli-supported militia in southern Lebanon as a "security zone" and buffer against attacks on its northern territory. Since then, the IDF fought for many years against the Shia organization Hezbollah, which became a growing threat to Israel. By July 1985, Israel's inflation, buttressed by complex index linking of salaries, had reached 480% per annum and was the highest in the world. Peres introduced emergency control of prices and cut government expenditure successfully bringing inflation under control. The currency (known as the old Israeli shekel) was replaced and renamed the Israeli new shekel at a rate of 1,000 old shkalim = 1 new shekel. In October 1985, Israel responded to a Palestinian terrorist attack in Cyprus by bombing the PLO headquarters in Tunis. Growing Israeli settlement and continuing occupation of the West Bank and Gaza Strip led to the first Palestinian Intifada (uprising) in 1987, which lasted until the Oslo accords of 1993, despite Israeli attempts to suppress it. Human rights abuses by Israeli troops led a group of Israelis to form B'Tselem, an organization devoted to improving awareness and compliance with human rights requirements in Israel.

In August 1987, the Israeli government cancelled the IAI Lavi project, an attempt to develop an independent Israeli fighter aircraft. The Israelis found themselves unable to sustain the huge development costs, and faced US opposition to a project that threatened US influence in Israel and US global military ascendancy. In September 1988, Israel launched an Ofeq reconnaissance satellite into orbit, using a Shavit rocket, thus becoming one of only eight countries possessing a capacity to independently launch satellites into space (two more have since developed this ability). The Alignment and Likud remained neck and neck in the 1988 elections (39:40 seats). Shamir successfully formed a national unity coalition with the Labour Alignment. In March 1990, Alignment leader Shimon Peres engineered a defeat of the government in a non-confidence vote and then tried to form a new government. He failed and Shamir became prime minister at the head of a right-wing coalition.

In 1990, the Soviet Union finally permitted free emigration of Soviet Jews to Israel. Prior to this, Jews trying to leave the USSR faced persecution; those who succeeded arrived as refugees. Over the next few years some one million Soviet citizens migrated to Israel. Although there was concern that some of the new immigrants had only a very tenuous connection to Judaism, and many were accompanied by non-Jewish relatives, this massive wave of migration slowly transformed Israel, bringing large numbers of highly educated Soviet Jews and creating a powerful Russian culture in Israel.

In August 1990, Iraq invaded Kuwait, triggering the Gulf War between Iraq and a large allied force, led by the United States. Iraq attacked Israel with 39 Scud missiles. Israel did not retaliate at request of the US, fearing that if Israel responded against Iraq, other Arab nations might desert the allied coalition. Israel provided gas masks for both the Palestinian population and Israeli citizens, while Netherlands and the United States deployed Patriot defence batteries in Israel as protection against the Scuds. In May 1991, during a 36-hour period, 15,000 Beta Israel (Ethiopian Jews) were secretly airlifted to Israel. The coalition's victory in the Gulf War opened new possibilities for regional peace, and in October 1991 the US president, George H. W. Bush, and Soviet Union Premier, Mikhail Gorbachev, jointly convened a historic meeting in Madrid of Israeli, Lebanese, Jordanian, Syrian, and Palestinian leaders. Shamir opposed the idea but agreed in return for loan guarantees to help with absorption of immigrants from the former Soviet Union. His participation in the conference led to the collapse of his (right-wing) coalition.

1992–1996: Rabin II; Peres II

In the 1992 elections, the Labour Party, led by Yitzhak Rabin, won a significant victory (44 seats) promising to pursue peace while promoting Rabin as a "tough general" and pledging not to deal with the PLO in any way. The left Zionist party Meretz won 12 seats, and the Arab and communist parties a further 5, meaning that parties supporting a peace treaty had a full (albeit small) majority in the Knesset. Later that year, the Israeli electoral system was changed to allow for direct election of the prime minister. It was hoped this would reduce the power of small parties to extract concessions in return for coalition agreements. The new system had the opposite effect; voters could split their vote for prime minister from their (interest based) party vote, and as a result larger parties won fewer votes and smaller parties becoming more attractive to voters. It thus increased the power of the smaller parties. By the 2006 election the system was abandoned.

On 25 July 1993, Israel carried out a week-long military operation in Lebanon to attack Hezbollah positions. On 13 September 1993, Israel and the Palestine Liberation Organization (PLO) signed the Oslo Accords (a Declaration of Principles) on the South Lawn of the White House. The principles established objectives relating to a transfer of authority from Israel to an interim Palestinian Authority, as a prelude to a final treaty establishing a Palestinian state, in exchange for mutual recognition. The DOP established May 1999 as the date by which a permanent status agreement for the West Bank and Gaza Strip would take effect. In February 1994, Baruch Goldstein, a follower of the Kach party, killed 29 Palestinians and wounded 125 at the Cave of the Patriarchs in Hebron, which became known as the Cave of the Patriarchs massacre. Kach had been barred from participation in the 1992 elections (on the grounds that the movement was racist). It was subsequently made illegal. Israel and the PLO signed the Gaza–Jericho Agreement in May 1994, and the Agreement on Preparatory Transfer of Powers and Responsibilities in August, which began the process of transferring authority from Israel to the Palestinians. On 25 July 1994, Jordan and Israel signed the Washington Declaration, which formally ended the state of war that had existed between them since 1948 and on 26 October the Israel–Jordan Treaty of Peace, witnessed by US President Bill Clinton.Treaty of Peace between The Hashemite Kingdom of Jordan and The State of Israel  King Hussein website

Prime Minister Yitzhak Rabin and PLO Chairman Yasser Arafat signed the Israeli–Palestinian Interim Agreement on the West Bank and the Gaza Strip on 28 September 1995 in Washington. The agreement was witnessed by President Bill Clinton on behalf of the United States and by Russia, Egypt, Norway and the European Union, and incorporates and supersedes the previous agreements, marking the conclusion of the first stage of negotiations between Israel and the PLO. The agreement allowed the PLO leadership to relocate to the occupied territories and granted autonomy to the Palestinians with talks to follow regarding final status. In return the Palestinians promised to abstain from use of terror and changed the Palestinian National Covenant, which had called for the expulsion of all Jews who migrated after 1917 and the elimination of Israel.

The agreement was opposed by Hamas and other Palestinian factions, which launched suicide bomber attacks at Israel. Rabin had a barrier constructed around Gaza to prevent attacks. The growing separation between Israel and the "Palestinian Territories" led to a labour shortage in Israel, mainly in the construction industry. Israeli firms began importing labourers from the Philippines, Thailand, China and Romania; some of these labourers stayed on without visas. In addition, a growing number of Africans began illegally migrating to Israel. On 4 November 1995, a far-right-wing religious Zionist opponent of the Oslo Accords assassinated Prime Minister Yitzhak Rabin. In February 1996 Rabin's successor, Shimon Peres, called early elections. In April 1996, Israel launched an operation in southern Lebanon as a result of Hezbollah's Katyusha rocket attacks on Israeli population centres along the border.

1996–2001: Netanyahu I; Barak

The May 1996 elections were the first featuring direct election of the prime minister and resulted in a narrow election victory for Likud leader Binyamin Netanyahu. A spate of suicide bombings reinforced the Likud position for security. Hamas claimed responsibility for most of the bombings. Despite his stated differences with the Oslo Accords, Prime Minister Netanyahu continued their implementation, but his prime ministership saw a marked slow-down in the Peace Process. Netanyahu also pledged to gradually reduce US aid to Israel.

In September 1996, a Palestinian riot broke out against the creation of an exit in the Western Wall tunnel. Over the subsequent few weeks, around 80 people were killed as a result. In January 1997 Netanyahu signed the Hebron Protocol with the Palestinian Authority, resulting in the redeployment of Israeli forces in Hebron and the turnover of civilian authority in much of the area to the Palestinian Authority.

In the election of July 1999, Ehud Barak of the Labour Party became Prime Minister. His party was the largest in the Knesset with 26 seats. In September 1999 the Supreme Court of Israel ruled that the use of torture in interrogation of Palestinian prisoners was illegal. On 21 March 2000, Pope John Paul II arrived in Israel for an historic visit.

On 25 May 2000, Israel unilaterally withdrew its remaining forces from the "security zone" in southern Lebanon. Several thousand members of the South Lebanon Army (and their families) left with the Israelis. The UN Secretary-General concluded that, as of 16 June 2000, Israel had withdrawn its forces from Lebanon in accordance with UN Security Council Resolution 425. Lebanon claims that Israel continues to occupy Lebanese territory called "Sheba'a Farms" (however this area was governed by Syria until 1967 when Israel took control). The Sheba'a Farms provided Hezbollah with a pretext to maintain warfare with Israel. The Lebanese government, in contravention of the UN Security Council resolution, did not assert sovereignty in the area, which came under Hezbollah control. In the Fall of 2000, talks were held at Camp David to reach a final agreement on the Israel/Palestine conflict. Ehud Barak offered to meet most of the Palestinian teams requests for territory and political concessions, including Arab parts of east Jerusalem; however, Arafat abandoned the talks without making a counterproposal.

Following its withdrawal from South Lebanon, Israel became a member of the Western European and Others Group at the United Nations. Prior to this Israel was the only nation at the UN which was not a member of any group (the Arab states would not allow it to join the Asia group), which meant it could not be a member of the Security Council or appoint anyone to the International Court and other key UN roles. Since December 2013 it has been a permanent member of the group.

In July 2000, Aryeh Deri was sentenced to 3 years in prison for bribe taking. Deri is regarded as the mastermind behind the rise of Shas and was a government minister at the age of 24. Political manipulation meant the investigation lasted for years. Deri subsequently sued a Police Officer who alleged that he was linked to the traffic-accident death of his mother-in-law (a key witness), who was run over in New York by a driver who had once been in the employ of an associate of Deri.

On 28 September 2000, Israeli opposition leader Ariel Sharon visited the Al-Aqsa compound, or Temple Mount, the following day the Palestinians launched the al-Aqsa Intifada. David Samuels and Khaled Abu Toameh have stated that the uprising was planned much earlier. In October 2000, Palestinians destroyed Joseph's Tomb, a Jewish shrine in Nablus.

The Arrow missile, a missile designed to destroy ballistic missiles, including Scud missiles, was first deployed by Israel. In 2001, with the Peace Process increasingly in disarray, Ehud Barak called a special election for Prime Minister. Barak hoped a victory would give him renewed authority in negotiations with the Palestinians. Instead opposition leader Ariel Sharon was elected PM. After this election, the system of directly electing the Premier was abandoned.

2001–2006: Sharon

The failure of the peace process, increased Palestinian terror and occasional attacks by Hezbollah from Lebanon, led much of the Israeli public and political leadership to lose confidence in the Palestinian Authority as a peace partner. Most felt that many Palestinians viewed the peace treaty with Israel as a temporary measure only. Many Israelis were thus anxious to disengage from the Palestinians. In response to a wave of suicide bomb attacks, culminating in the Passover massacre (see List of Israeli civilian casualties in the Second Intifada), Israel launched Operation Defensive Shield in March 2002, and Sharon began the construction of a barrier around the West Bank. Around the same time, the Israeli town of Sderot and other Israeli communities near Gaza became subject to constant shelling and mortar bomb attacks from Gaza.

Thousands of Jews from Latin America began arriving in Israel due to economic crises in their countries of origin. In January 2003 separate elections were held for the Knesset. Likud won the most seats (27). An anti-religion party, Shinui, led by media pundit Tommy Lapid, won 15 seats on a secularist platform, making it the third largest party (ahead of orthodox Shas). Internal fighting led to Shinui's demise at the next election. In 2004, the Black Hebrews were granted permanent residency in Israel. The group had begun migrating to Israel 25 years earlier from the United States, but had not been recognized as Jews by the state and hence not granted citizenship under Israel's Law of Return. They had settled in Israel without official status. From 2004 onwards, they received citizen's rights.

The Sharon government embarked on an extensive program of construction of desalinization plants that freed Israel of the fear of drought. Some of the Israeli desalinization plants are the largest of their kind in the world.

In May 2004, Israel launched Operation Rainbow in southern Gaza to create a safer environment for the IDF soldiers along the Philadelphi Route. On 30 September 2004, Israel carried out Operation Days of Penitence in northern Gaza to destroy the launching sites of Palestinian rockets which were used to attack Israeli towns. In 2005, all Jewish settlers were evacuated from Gaza (some forcibly) and their homes demolished. Disengagement from the Gaza Strip was completed on 12 September 2005. Military disengagement from the northern West Bank was completed ten days later.

In 2005 Sharon left the Likud and formed a new party called Kadima, which accepted that the peace process would lead to creation of a Palestinian state. He was joined by many leading figures from both Likud and Labour.

Hamas won the 2006 Palestinian legislative election, the first and only genuinely free Palestinian elections. Hamas' leaders rejected all agreements signed with Israel, refused to recognize Israel's right to exist, refused to abandon terror, and occasionally claimed the Holocaust was a Jewish conspiracy. The withdrawal and Hamas victory left the status of Gaza unclear, as Israel asserted it was no longer an occupying power but continued to control air and sea access to Gaza although it did not exercise sovereignty on the ground. Egypt insisted that it was still occupied and refused to open border crossings with Gaza, although it was free to do so.

In April 2006 Ariel Sharon was incapacitated by a severe hemorrhagic stroke and Ehud Olmert became Prime Minister.

2006–2009: Olmert

Ehud Olmert was elected Prime Minister after his party, Kadima, won the most seats (29) in the 2006 Israeli legislative election. In 2005 Mahmoud Ahmadinejad was officially elected president of Iran; since then, Iranian policy towards Israel has grown more confrontational. Israeli analysts believe Ahmadinejad has worked to undermine the peace process with arms supplies and aid to Hezbullah in South Lebanon and Hamas in Gaza, and is developing nuclear weapons, possibly for use against Israel. Iranian support for Hezbollah and its nuclear arms program are in contravention of UN Security Council resolutions 1559 and 1747. Iran also encourages Holocaust denial. Following the Israeli withdrawal from Lebanon, Hezbollah had mounted periodic attacks on Israel, which did not lead to Israeli retaliation. Similarly, the withdrawal from Gaza led to incessant shelling of towns around the Gaza area with only minimal Israeli response. The failure to react led to criticism from the Israeli right and undermined the government.

On 14 March 2006, Israel carried out an operation in the Palestinian Authority prison of Jericho in order to capture Ahmad Sa'adat and several Palestinian Arab prisoners located there who assassinated Israeli politician Rehavam Ze'evi in 2001. The operation was conducted as a result of the expressed intentions of the newly elected Hamas government to release these prisoners. On 25 June 2006, a Hamas force crossed the border from Gaza and attacked a tank, capturing Israeli soldier Gilad Shalit, sparking clashes in Gaza.

On 12 July, Hezbollah attacked Israel from Lebanon, shelled Israeli towns and attacked a border patrol, taking two dead or badly wounded Israeli soldiers. These incidents led Israel to initiate the Second Lebanon War, which lasted through August 2006. Israeli forces entered some villages in Southern Lebanon, while the air force attacked targets all across the country. Israel only made limited ground gains until the launch of Operation Changing Direction 11, which lasted for 3 days with disputed results. Shortly before a UN ceasefire came into effect, Israeli troops captured Wadi Saluki. The war concluded with Hezbollah evacuating its forces from Southern Lebanon, while the IDF remained until its positions could be handed over to the Lebanese Armed Forces and UNIFIL.

In 2007 education was made compulsory until the age of 18 for all citizens (it had been 16). Refugees from the genocide in Darfur, mostly Muslim, arrived in Israel illegally, with some given asylum. Illegal immigrants arrived mainly from Africa in addition to foreign workers overstaying their visas. The numbers of such migrants are not known, and estimates vary between 30,000 and over 100,000.

An American billionaire casino owner, Sheldon Adelson, set up a free newspaper Israel Hayom with the express intention of reducing the influence of the dominant (centre-left) newspaper Yediot Ahronot and accelerating a right-ward shift in Israeli politics by supporting Netanyahu.

In June 2007 Hamas took control of the Gaza Strip in the course of the Battle of Gaza, seizing government institutions and replacing Fatah and other government officials with its own. Following the takeover, Egypt and Israel imposed a partial blockade, on the grounds that Fatah had fled and was no longer providing security on the Palestinian side, and to prevent arms smuggling by terrorist groups. On 6 September 2007, the Israeli Air Force destroyed a nuclear reactor in Syria. On 28 February 2008, Israel launched a military campaign in Gaza in response to the constant firing of Qassam rockets by Hamas militants. On 16 July 2008, Hezbollah swapped the bodies of Israeli soldiers Ehud Goldwasser and Eldad Regev, kidnapped in 2006, in exchange for the Lebanese terrorist Samir Kuntar, four Hezbollah prisoners, and the bodies of 199 Palestinian Arab and Lebanese fighters.

Olmert came under investigation for corruption and this led him to announce on 30 July 2008, that he would be stepping down as Prime Minister following election of a new leader of the Kadima party in September 2008. Tzipi Livni won the election, but was unable to form a coalition and Olmert remained in office until the general election. Israel carried out Operation Cast Lead in the Gaza Strip from 27 December 2008 to 18 January 2009 in response to rocket attacks from Hamas militants, leading to a decrease of Palestinian rocket attacks.

2009–2021: Netanyahu II

In the 2009 legislative election Likud won 27 seats and Kadima 28; however, the right-wing camp won a majority of seats, and President Shimon Peres called on Netanyahu to form the government. Russian immigrant-dominated Yisrael Beiteinu came third with 15 seats, and Labour was reduced to fourth place with 13 seats. In 2009, Israeli billionaire Yitzhak Tshuva announced the discovery of huge natural gas reserves off the coast of Israel.

On 31 May 2010, an international incident broke out in the Mediterranean Sea when foreign activists trying to break the maritime blockade over Gaza, clashed with Israeli troops. During the struggle, nine Turkish activists were killed. In late September 2010 took place direct negotiations between Israel and the Palestinians without success. As a defensive countermeasure to the rocket threat against Israel's civilian population, at the end of March 2011 Israel began to operate the advanced mobile air defence system "Iron Dome" in the southern region of Israel and along the border with the Gaza Strip.

On 14 July 2011, the largest social protest in the history of Israel began in which hundreds of thousands of protesters from a variety of socio-economic and religious backgrounds in Israel protested against the continuing rise in the cost of living (particularly housing) and the deterioration of public services in the country (such as health and education). The peak of the demonstrations took place on 3 September 2011, in which about 400,000 people demonstrated across the country.

In October 2011, a deal was reached between Israel and Hamas, by which the kidnapped Israeli soldier Gilad Shalit was released in exchange for 1,027 Palestinians and Arab-Israeli prisoners. In March 2012, Secretary-general of the Popular Resistance Committees, Zuhir al-Qaisi, a senior PRC member and two additional Palestinian militants were assassinated during a targeted killing carried out by Israeli forces in Gaza. The Palestinian armed factions in the Gaza Strip, led by the Islamic Jihad and the Popular Resistance Committees, fired a massive amount of rockets towards southern Israel in retaliation, sparking five days of clashes along the Gaza border.

In May 2012, Prime Minister Benjamin Netanyahu reached an agreement with the Head of Opposition Shaul Mofaz for Kadima to join the government, thus cancelling the early election supposed to be held in September. However, in July, the Kadima party left Netanyahu's government due to a dispute concerning military conscription for ultra-Orthodox Jews in Israel.

In June 2012, Israel transferred the bodies of 91 Palestinian suicide bombers and other militants as part of what Mark Regev, spokesman for Netanyahu, described as a "humanitarian gesture" to PA chairman Mahmoud Abbas to help revive the peace talks, and reinstate direct negotiations between Israel and the Palestinians. On 21 October 2012, United States and Israel began their biggest joint air and missile defence exercise, known as Austere Challenge 12, involving around 3,500 US troops in the region along with 1,000 IDF personnel, expected to last three weeks. Germany and Britain also participated. In response to over a hundred rocket attacks on southern Israeli cities, Israel began an operation in Gaza on 14 November 2012, with the targeted killing of Ahmed Jabari, chief of Hamas military wing, and airstrikes against twenty underground sites housing long-range missile launchers capable of striking Tel Aviv. In January 2013, construction of the barrier on the Israeli-Egyptian border was completed in its main section.

Benjamin Netanyahu was elected Prime Minister again after the Likud Yisrael Beiteinu alliance won the most seats (31) in the 2013 legislative election and formed a coalition government with secular centrist Yesh Atid party (19), rightist The Jewish Home (12) and Livni's Hatnuah (6), excluding Haredi parties. Labour came in third with 15 seats. In July 2013, as a "good will gesture" to restart peace talks with the Palestinian Authority, Israel agreed to release 104 Palestinian prisoners, most of whom had been in jail since before the 1993 Oslo Accords, including militants who had killed Israeli civilians. In April 2014, Israel suspended peace talks after Hamas and Fatah agreed to form a unity government.

Following an escalation of rocket attacks by Hamas, Israel started an operation in the Gaza Strip on 8 July 2014, which included a ground incursion aimed at destroying the cross-border tunnels. Differences over the budget and a "Jewish state" bill triggered early elections in December 2014. After the 2015 Israeli elections, Netanyahu renewed his mandate as Prime Minister when Likud obtained 30 seats and formed a right-wing coalition government with Kulanu (10), The Jewish Home (8), and Orthodox parties Shas (7) and United Torah Judaism (6), the bare minimum of seats required to form a coalition. The Zionist Union alliance came second with 24 seats. A wave of lone-wolf attacks by Palestinians took place in 2015 and 2016, particularly stabbings.

On 6 December 2017, President Donald Trump formally announced United States recognition of Jerusalem as the capital of Israel, which was followed by the United States recognition of the Golan Heights as part of Israel on 25 March 2019. In March 2018, Palestinians in Gaza initiated "the Great March of Return," a series of weekly protests along the Gaza–Israel border.

The COVID-19 pandemic began in Israel with the first case detected in February 2020 and the first death being that of a Holocaust survivor in March 2020. Israel Shield was the government's program to combat against the virus. Nationwide lockdowns and mask mandates were present throughout the country for much of 2020 into 2021, with the vaccination campaign beginning in December 2020 along with green passes.

In late 2020, Israel normalised relations with four Arab League countries: the United Arab Emirates and Bahrain in September (known as the Abraham Accords), Sudan in October, and Morocco in December. In May 2021, after tensions escalated in Jerusalem, Israel and Hamas traded blows in Gaza for eleven days.

The 2019–2022 political crisis featured political instability in Israel leading to five elections to the Knesset over a 4 year time period. The April 2019 and September 2019 elections saw no party able to form a coalition leading to the March 2020 election. This election again looked to result in deadlock, but due to the worsening COVID-19 pandemic, Netanyahu, and Blue and White leader, Benny Gantz, were able to establish a unity government with a planned rotating prime ministership where Netanyahu would serve first and later be replaced by Gantz. The coalition failed by December due to a dispute over the budget and new elections were called for March 2021.

 2021–present: Bennett; Lapid; Netanyahu III 

Following the March 2021 election, Naftali Bennett signed a coalition agreement with Yair Lapid and different parties opposed to Netanyahu on the right, center and left whereby Bennett would serve as Prime Minister until September 2023 and then Lapid would assume the role until November 2025. An Israeli Arab party, Ra'am, was included in the government coalition for the first time in decades. In June 2022, following several legislative defeats for the governing coalition, Bennett announced the introduction of a bill to dissolve the Knesset and call for new elections to be held in November. Yair Lapid became the new interim Prime Minister. After the 2022 elections, Netanyahu was able to return as Prime Minister under a coalition that included Likud, Shas, United Torah Judaism, Religious Zionist Party, Otzma Yehudit and Noam, in what was described as the most right-wing government in the country's history.

Demographics

See also

 Archaeology of Israel
 Hebrew calendar
 History of the Arab–Israeli conflict
 History of the Israel Defense Forces
 History of Jerusalem
 History of the Jews and Judaism in the Land of Israel
 History of the Middle East
 History of Palestine
 History of Zionism
 Jewish history
 Jewish military history
 Levantine archaeology
 LGBT history in Israel
 List of Israeli museums
 List of Jewish leaders in the Land of Israel
 List of years in Israel
 Politics of Israel
 Postage stamps and postal history of Israel
 Time periods in the Palestine region
 Timeline of Israeli history
 Timeline of the history of the region of Palestine

Notes

References

Further reading

 Berger, Earl The Covenant and the Sword: Arab–Israeli Relations, 1948–56, London, Routledge K. Paul, 1965.
 Bregman, Ahron A History of Israel, Houndmills, Basingstoke, Hampshire; New York: Palgrave Macmillan, 2002 .
 
 Butler, L. J. Britain and Empire: Adjusting to a Post-Imperial World I.B. Tauris 2002 
 Caspit, Ben. The Netanyahu Years (2017) excerpt 
 
 Darwin, John Britain and Decolonisation: The Retreat from Empire in the Post-War World Palgrave Macmillan 1988 
 Davis, John, The Evasive Peace: a Study of the Zionist-Arab Problem, London: J. Murray, 1968.
 
 Eytan, Walter The First Ten Years: a Diplomatic History of Israel, London: Weidenfeld and Nicolson, 1958
 Feis, Herbert. The birth of Israel: the tousled diplomatic bed (1969) online
 Gilbert, Martin Israel: A History, New York: Morrow, 1998 .
 Horrox, James A Living Revolution: Anarchism in the Kibbutz Movement, Oakland: AK Press, 2009
 Herzog, Chaim The Arab–Israeli Wars: War and Peace in the Middle East from the War of Independence to Lebanon, London: Arms and Armour; Tel Aviv, Israel: Steimatzky, 1984 .
 Israel Office of Information Israel's Struggle for Peace, New York, 1960.
 
 Klagsbrun, Francine. Lioness: Golda Meir and the Nation of Israel (Schocken, 2017) excerpt .
 Laqueur, Walter Confrontation: the Middle-East War and World Politics, London: Wildwood House, 1974, .
 
 Lucas, Noah The Modern History of Israel, New York: Praeger, 1975.
 
 
 
 
 Morris, Benny 1948: A History of the First Arab–Israeli War, Yale University Press, 2008. .
 O'Brian, Conor Cruise The Siege: the Saga of Israel and Zionism, New York: Simon and Schuster, 1986 .
 Oren, Michael Six Days of War: June 1967 and the Making of the Modern Middle East, Oxford: Oxford University Press, 2002 .
 Pfeffer, Anshel. Bibi: The Turbulent Life and Times of Benjamin Netanyahu (2018).
 Rabinovich, Itamar. Yitzhak Rabin: Soldier, Leader, Statesman (Yale UP, 2017). excerpt 
 Rubinstein, Alvin Z. (editor) The Arab–Israeli Conflict: Perspectives, New York: Praeger, 1984 .
 Lord Russell of Liverpool, If I Forget Thee; the Story of a Nation's Rebirth, London, Cassell 1960.
 
 Samuel, Rinna A History of Israel: the Birth, Growth and Development of Today's Jewish State, London: Weidenfeld and Nicolson, 1989 .
 Schultz, Joseph & Klausner, Carla From Destruction to Rebirth: The Holocaust and the State of Israel, Washington, D.C.: University Press of America, 1978 .
 Segev, Tom The Seventh Million: the Israelis and the Holocaust, New York: Hill and Wang, 1993 .
 Shapira Anita. ‘'Israel: A History'’ (Brandeis University Press/University Press of New England; 2012) 502 pages;
 Sharon, Assaf, "The Long Paralysis of the Israeli Left" (review of Dan Ephron, Killing a King: The Assassination of Yitzhak Rabin and the Remaking of Israel, Norton, 290 pp.; and Itamar Rabinovich, Yitzhak Rabin: Soldier, Leader, Statesman, Yale University Press, 272 pp.), The New York Review of Books, vol. LXVI, no. 17 (7 November 2019), pp. 32–34.
 Shatz, Adam, "We Are Conquerors" (review of Tom Segev, A State at Any Cost: The Life of David Ben-Gurion, Head of Zeus, 2019, 804 pp.), London Review of Books, vol. 41, no. 20 (24 October 2019), pp. 37–38, 40–42. "Segev's biography... shows how central exclusionary nationalism, war and racism were to Ben-Gurion's vision of the Jewish homeland in Palestine, and how contemptuous he was not only of the Arabs but of Jewish life outside Zion. [Liberal Jews] may look at the state that Ben-Gurion built, and ask if the cost has been worth it." (p. 42 of Shatz's review.)
 Shlaim, Avi, The Iron Wall: Israel and the Arab World (2001)
 
 Talmon, Jacob L. Israel Among the Nations, London: Weidenfeld & Nicolson, 1970 .
 Wolffsohn, Michael Eternal Guilt?: Forty years of German-Jewish-Israeli Relations, New York: Columbia University Press, 1993 .

Primary sources
 Laqueur, Walter, and Dan Schueftan, eds. The Israel-Arab Reader: A Documentary History of the Middle East Conflict'' (8th ed. Penguin, 2016). online 2001 edition

External links

Facts About Israel: History at the Israel Ministry of Foreign Affairs
Israel profile – Timeline at the BBC News Online
History of Israel at the Knesset website
Official website of the Israel State Archives

 
Israel, history of